= 310s BC =

Decade

This article concerns the period 319 BC – 310 BC.

== Events ==
=== 319 BC ===
==== By place ====
====== Macedonian Empire ======
- Battle of Orkynia: Antigonus marches his army against Eumenes in Cappadocia and defeats him in battle at Orkynia.
- Eumenes retreats to the fortress of Nora. Antigonus follows him there and starts a siege.
- Battle of Cretopolis: Antigonus leaves a small force to besiege Eumenes, marches with the rest of his army against the remnants of the Perdiccan faction and defeats them at Cretopolis.
- The Athenian orator and diplomat, Demades, is sent to the Macedonian court, but either the Macedonian regent Antipater or his son Cassander, learning that Demades has intrigued with the former regent Perdiccas, puts him to death.
- Antipater becomes ill and dies shortly after, leaving the regency of the Macedonian Empire to the aged Polyperchon, passing over his son Cassander, a measure which gives rise to much confusion and ill-feeling.
- Polyperchon's authority is challenged by Antipater's son Cassander, who refuses to acknowledge the new regent. With the aid of Antigonus, ruler of Phrygia, and with the support of Ptolemy and Lysimachus, Cassander seizes most of Greece including Macedonia.
- Eumenes allies himself with the regent Polyperchon. He manages to escape from the siege of Nora, and his forces soon threaten Syria and Phoenicia. Polyperchon recognises Eumenes as the royal general in Asia Minor.
- Alexander the Great's widow, Roxana, joins Alexander's mother, Olympias, in Epirus.

=== 318 BC ===
==== By place ====
====== Macedonian Empire ======
- Antigonus resolves to become lord of all Asia, and in conjunction with Cassander and Ptolemy. He enters into negotiations with Eumenes; but Eumenes remains faithful to the royal house. He raises an army and forms a coalition with the satraps of the eastern provinces. He then captures Babylon from Antigonus.
- Antigonus marches against Eumenes, so Eumenes withdraws east to join the satraps of the provinces beyond the Tigris River.
- Cassander, who has allied himself with Ptolemy and Antigonus, declares war on the regent, Polyperchon. Most of the Greek states support him, including Athens. Cassander further effects an alliance with Eurydice, the ambitious wife of King Philip III Arrhidaeus of Macedon.
- Although Polyperchon is initially successful in securing control of the Greek cities, whose freedom he proclaims, his fleet is destroyed by Antigonus.

====== Greece ======
- In a power struggle in Athens after the death of Antipater, Phocion is deposed as the ruler of Athens, convicted of treason, and executed by those Athenians hoping to restore democracy to the city. Shortly afterward, the Athenians decree a public burial and a statue in his honor.

====== China ======
- The state of Qin moves into the Sichuan basin, giving them control of that great food-producing plain.

==== By topic ====
====== Music ======
- Aristoxenus, a Greek peripatetic philosopher, and writer on music and rhythm, and a pupil of Aristotle, writes a treatise on music called the "Elements of Harmony".

=== 317 BC ===
==== By place ====
====== Macedonian Empire ======
- Battle of Byzantium: At the start of the year, Antigonus Monophthalmus sends Nicanor with a large fleet to do battle with Cleitus the White at the Hellespont. The two fleets meet in near Byzantium, Cleitus wins a victory in which some 70 ships of Nicanor are captured, sunk or disabled, the remnant escaping to Chalcedon, where they are joined by Antigonus and his army. Antigonus orders the remaining 60 ships to be readied for renewed action, and assigns his strongest and most loyal soldiers as marines to these ships. Meanwhile, the Byzantines transport his archers, slingers and peltast to the European shore, where Cleitus's victorious forces were encamped. At dawn the next day Antigonus launches an assault by land and sea and catches Cleitus completely by surprise; Cleitus’s entire force is captured or killed.
- Seleucus joins Antigonus against Eumenes and recaptures Babylon.
- Battle of Paraitacene: The first battle of Western armies each with an elephant corps who fight for control over Alexander's empire. The armies of Antigonus and Eumenes fight each other near today's Isfahan in Persia with no clear victor.
- Armenia's Persian satrap, Ardvates, frees his country from Macedonian control.
- After capturing Athens from Macedonia's regent Polyperchon, Cassander entrusts the government of Athens to the Athenian orator, statesman, and philosopher, Demetrius Phalereus.
- Polyperchon flees to Epirus, where he joins Alexander the Great's mother Olympias, Alexander's widow Roxana, and Alexander's infant son Alexander IV. He forms an alliance with Olympias, who is acting as regent for Alexander IV, and King Aeacides of Epirus.
- While Cassander is occupied in the Peloponnesus, Olympias leads an army into Macedonia. She is initially successful, defeating the army of King Philip III Arrhidaeus and capturing King Philip and his wife, Eurydice, as well as Cassander's brother, Nicanor. She then has them murdered.
- Ptolemy marries Berenice, lady-in-waiting to his first wife Eurydice.

====== Sicily ======
- Acestorides, a native of Corinth, is made supreme commander by the citizens of Syracuse.
- After twice being banished for attempting to overthrow the oligarchical party, Agathocles returns with an army and banishes or murders about 10,000 citizens (including the oligarchs), and sets himself up as tyrant of Syracuse. Acestorides is banished from the city.

==== By topic ====
====== Art ======
- Private funeral monuments are banned in Athenian cemeteries.

====== Literature ======
- Menander wins the first prize at the Lenaian festival with his play Dyskolos (The Grouch).

=== 316 BC ===
==== By place ====
====== Macedonian Empire ======
- Eumenes and Antigonus, rivals to Cassander for control of Macedonia, meet in the Battle of Gabiene in Media to the northeast of Susa. Antigonus defeats Eumenes, with the aid of Seleucus and Peithon (the satraps of Babylonia and Media, respectively). The result is inconclusive. However, some of Eumenes' soldiers take matters into their own hands. Learning that Antigonus has captured many of their wives, children and the cumulative plunder of nearly 40 years of continuous warfare, they secretly open negotiations with Antigonus for their safe return. They hand over Eumenes and his senior officers to Antigonus in return for their baggage and families. Eumenes is put to death by Antigonus after a week's captivity.

====== Greece ======
- Cassander returns from the Peloponnesus and defeats Macedonia's regent Polyperchon in battle. Cassander blockades Olympias, mother of the late Alexander the Great, in Pydna, where she surrenders. Cassander takes Roxana and her son Alexander IV of Macedon into his custody.
- Olympias is condemned to death by Cassander, but his soldiers refuse to carry out the sentence. She is eventually killed by relatives of those she has previously had executed.
- Cassander marries Thessaloniki, half-sister of Alexander the Great. He has Alexander's widow, Roxana and son, Alexander IV of Macedon, imprisoned at Amphipolis in Thrace. They are never to be seen alive again.
- Cassander founds, on Pallenê, a city called Cassandreia
- Thebes, which has been destroyed by Alexander the Great, begins to be rebuilt by Cassander with the help of the citizens of Athens.
- In Rhodes (city), a major flood occurs. At least five hundred people die and many houses collapse.

====== Sicily ======
- Agathocles, the new tyrant of Syracuse, extends his rule over the eastern part of the island.

====== Roman Republic ======
- The Romans, with an eye to capturing Apulia, send an army (led by dictator Quintus Fabius Maximus Rullianus) to seize the town of Lucera from the Samnites. They are badly beaten in the Battle of Lautulae and the Samnites go on to reach within 32 kilometres of Rome.

====== China ======
- King Hui of Qin decides, on the advice of General Sima Cuo, to invade and annex the ancient states of Ba and Shu in Sichuan, in order to increase Qin's agricultural output and obtain a strategic platform from which to defeat the state of Chu.

=== 315 BC ===
==== By place ====
====== Macedonian Empire ======
- Antigonus claims authority over most of Asia, seizes the treasury at Susa and enters Babylon, where Seleucus is governor. Seleucus flees to Ptolemy in Egypt and enters into a league with him, Lysimachus (the ruler of Thrace) and Cassander, against Antigonus. This leads to the First Coalition War.
- Aristodemus of Miletus, by order of Antigonus, sails to Laconia, where he receives permission from the Spartans to recruit 8000 mercenaries. He also meets Alexander and Polyperchon, thus establishing friendship between them and Antigonus
- Polyperchon is appointed general of the Peloponnesus
- Alexander (son of Polyperchon) sails to Antigonus in Asia. They make a pact of friendship and, by order of Antigonus, Alexander sails back to the Peloponnesus
- Peithon consolidates his power base in the eastern part of the Empire.
- Antigonus drives out Cassander's Macedonian forces of occupation from the Greek islands and forms the island cities in the Aegean into the "League of the Islanders", preparatory to his invasion of Greece. His ally, the city of Rhodes, furnishes him with the necessary fleet.

====== Greece ======
- The King of Epirus, Aeacides, faces a revolt from his people and they drive him from the kingdom. His son, Phyrrhus, who is then only two years old, is saved from being killed by some faithful servants. Cassander takes control of Epirus.
- In Macedonia the port city of Thessaloniki is founded by Cassander and named after his wife Thessalonike.
- Cassander appoints Apollonides as Governor of Argos
- Apollonides initiates a raid on Arcadia during the night.
- Cassander sends Prepelaus to Alexander (son of Polyperchon) and he convinces Alexander to desert Antigonus by offering command of all the Peloponnesus and making him general of an army

====== Cyprus ======
- Ptolemy's armies fight supporters of Antigonus in Cyprus. Ptolemy is able to re-conquer the island.

====== Sicily ======
- Agathocles, the tyrant of Syracuse, seizes the city of Messina.

====== Roman Republic ======
- The Romans take Ferentum, a city of Apulia, and this pushes the citizens of Nuceria to end their friendship with Rome.
- The Samnites defeat a Roman army led by dictator Quintus Fabius Maximus Rullianus at the Battle of Lautulae.

==== India ====
- The Indian king Porus, ally of Alexander The Great, is killed by Eudemus, another general of Alexander. The son of Porus, Malayketu, seizes his territory back by killing Eudemus.

=== 314 BC ===
==== By place ====
====== Macedonian Empire ======
- Aristodemus of Miletus convinces the common assembly of the Aetolians to support Antigonus
- Alexander, son of Polyperchon, is killed by Alexion of Sicyon. Alexander's wife Cratesipolis assumes power and holds his army together.
- Antigonus, the ruler of the Asian parts of the late Alexander the Great's empire, faces a coalition consisting of Cassander, the Macedonian regent; Lysimachus, the satrap of Thrace; and Ptolemy, the satrap of Egypt, who have taken the side of the ousted satrap of Babylon, Seleucus.
- Antigonus does not trust Peithon's growing power. So Antigonus tricks Peithon to come to his court, where Antigonus has him executed.
- Antigonus invades Syria, then under Ptolemy's control, and besieges and captures Tyre. Antigonus then occupies Syria, proclaiming himself regent.

====== Greece ======
- As Cassander fights to retain control over central Greece, Antigonus promises freedom to the Greek cities in a bid to gain support from them against Cassander.
- The Aetolians enter into an alliance with Antigonus, and the League of the Islanders is established under Antigonus' hegemony. Cassander marches against them with his allies Lysimachus, Ptolemy and Seleucus and destroys the city of Agrinio.

====== Roman Republic ======
- Success seems to be going the Samnites' way in their ongoing battles against the Romans. Campania is on the verge of deserting Rome. Peace is established between Rome and some Samnite towns.
- The Roman consuls march their combined army to Tarracina and defeat a Samnite army there; killing 10,000 Samnites in the battle and the subsequent pursuit.
- While the consuls are fighting the Samnites at Tarracina, the Romans elect Gaius Maenius as Dictator with Marcus Foslius Flaccinator as his Magister Equitum (Master-of-Horse, Second-in-Command) and send them into Campania at the head of a large army. When Maenius and Foslius arrive near Capua, the Campanians, hearing about the defeat of the Samnites at Tarracina, start negotiating terms with the Romans; they surrender those who are guilty of the uprising and in turn are reinstated in their alliance with Rome.

====== China ======
- Zhou Nan Wang becomes King of the Zhou dynasty of China.
- The city of Guilin is founded by the Qin dynasty.

=== 313 BC ===
==== By place ====
====== Syria ======
- Antigonus sends Telesphorus to the Peloponnesus to free the cities.

====== Egypt ======
- Ptolemy, whose Egyptian kingdom includes Cyprus, puts down a revolt there.
- A revolt in Cyrene is also crushed.

====== Asia Minor ======
- Prepelaus arrives in Caria and starts making plans with Asander. They decide on a surprise attack on Ptolemy, the commander of Antigonus' forces in western Asia Minor. Eupolemus, one of Prepelaus' lieutenants, is sent with 8,000 infantry and 200 cavalry. However, some deserters from Eupolemus' strike force betray their plans to Ptolemy who quickly gathers 8,300 infantry and 600 cavalry from their winter quarters and marches against Eupolemus. In the middle of the night Ptolemy launches a surprise attack on Eupolemus' camp capturing the entire force with ease.
- Antigonus, after finding a pass across the Taurus Mountains that was still open, marches his main army into Asia Minor and goes into winter quarters in Celaenae in Phrygia. Meanwhile, Antigonus' admiral Medius is ordered to sail the new Antigonid fleet from Phoenicia into the Aegean. On route he captures one of Cassander's fleets (the one that had escorted Prepelaus to Asia Minor).
- Asander agrees to send all his soldiers to Antigonus to help keep Greek cities autonomous
- Asander sends emissaries to Ptolemy and Seleucus asking for help

====== Thrace ======
- In the spring of 313 a revolt against Lysimachus is under way in the Greek cities of the northwestern Black Sea coast. Callatis, Istria and Odessus rebel. The latter two are quickly taken by Lysimachus, but Callatis holds out. Antigonus sends a fleet and an army under a general named Pausanias to aid the city, he also persuades the Thracian king Seuthes to rebel. Lysimachus leaves part of his army to continue the siege, while he himself marches against Pausanias. He fights his way past Seuthes through the Haemus Mountains and captures Pausanias' force, enrolling them in his army. Pausanias is killed in battle, but most of his officers are ransomed back to Antigonus.

====== Greece ======
- Becoming tired of Macedonian rule, the people of Epirus recall their former king Aeacides (who until then had been campaigning with his old ally Polyperchon in the Peloponnese). Cassander immediately sends an army against him under his brother Philip, who is diverted from invading Aetolia.
- At the autumn meeting of the Aetolian League, Aristodemus of Miletus, Antigonus' top diplomat, is able to persuade the Aetolians to support Antigonus.
- Aristodemus and his mercenary army (recruited the year prior) cross over to the Peloponnese and fight Alexander, the son of Polyperchon, at Cyllene, and liberate Patrae and Aegium from Cassander's garrisons. Aristodemus then returns to Aetolia, leaving a sizeable force in the Pelopponese who help the city of Dyme eject its garrison, despite a failed intervention by Alexander.
- Philip marches into Acarnania to prevent Aeacides from linking up with the Aetolians. Philip defeats Aeacides in battle, killing many Epirotes and capturing 50 leading supporters of Aeacides, sending them as prisoners to Macedon. Aeacides, with the remnant of his forces, joins the Aetolians. Philip catches up to Aeacides and the Aetolians at Oeniadae and defeats them in battle. Aeacides, who was wounded in the Battle of Oeniadae, dies a few days later. The remaining Aetolian army takes refuge in the surrounding mountains.
- Cassander, hearing of Aristodemus' success with the Aetolians, marches south in force, persuades the Acarnanians to ally with him, and campaigns successfully along the Adriatic coast; capturing Apollonia and defeating the Illyrian king Glaucius. At the end of the year Cassander returns to Macedon.
- With his western border thus strengthened, Cassander sends Prepelaus, one of his top generals, with an army to Asia Minor to aid his ally Asander.
- Cassander orders Dionysius (the commander of his garrison in Athens) and Demetrius of Phalerum (the tyrant of Athens) to send a fleet of 20 warships to try and recapture Lemnos. An Athenian strategos named Aristoteles is sent, ravaging the island in conjunction with Seleucus (who was sent into the Aegean by Ptolemy). After Seleucus sails away, Aristoteles is attacked by the Antigonid fleet, most of his ships being captured.

====== Italy ======
- The Samnites take Fregellae in Latium, the Roman dictator Gaius Poetelius Libo Visolus marches his army from Rome and moves to retake it, but the Samnites leave at night; Visolus places a garrison in the city.
- The consul Gaius Junius Bubulcus Brutus is credited with the capture of Nola, Atina, and Calatia by some sources.

- The Romans capture Nola by setting fire to the buildings near the city walls and storming the city after the walls collapse.

- The Romans establish colonies at the Volscian island of Pontiae, the Volscian town of Interamna Sucasina and at Suessa Aurunca.

====== Sicily ======
- Deinocrates, the leader of the Syracusan exiles, sends envoys to the Carthaginians to ask them for help against Agathocles, the tyrant of Syracuse. The Carthaginians, fearing for their own possessions in Sicily, send a large force to the island.
- The exiles send Nymphodorus (a friend of Deinocrates) with some soldiers to take Centoripini (some of whose elite had promised to assist the exiles in taking the city). Nymphodorus is killed in the failed attempt to capture the city. Agathocles executes everyone he suspects of sedition in the city.

=== 312 BC ===
==== By place ====
====== Cyrenaica ======
- The people of Cyrene in the Cyrenaica rise up in a revolt against Ptolemy, putting the Ptolemaic garrison, which occupies their citadel, under siege. After they execute Ptolemy's envoys, who came to bade them to cease their sedition, he sends Agis (one of his generals) with an army and Epaunetus (another general) with a fleet to put down the rebellion. Agis storms the city, captures the rebels, and sends the ringleaders to Alexandria.

====== Cyprus ======
- After putting down the revolt in Cyrene, Ptolemy sails to Cyprus with a great force. He arrests the rulers of Kition, Lapethus, Kyrenia, and Marion for being too friendly towards Antigonus and/or too hostile towards himself, he then establishes his friend Nicocreon of Salamis as strategos (governor-general) of Cyprus .

====== Syria/Mesopotamia/Babylonia ======
- Ptolemy raids Antigonus' territories in Cilicia and Syria, and then sails back to Egypt.
- At the end of the year, Ptolemy invades Antigonus' territories in Palestine with an army of 18,000 infantry and 4,000 cavalry. The resulting Battle of Gaza leads to a triumph for Ptolemy over Antigonus' son, Demetrius.
- Demetrius rallies the remnants of his army at Tripolis and summons reinforcements from the garrisons of upper Syria and Cilicia; he also writes his father, Antigonus, and urges him to send help. Meanwhile Ptolemy captures Acre, Joppa, Samaria and Sidon, and starts to besiege Tyre.
- Seleucus ceases his service to Ptolemy and returns to his former province, Babylonia. This event takes place on October 1 and becomes the starting point of the Seleucid era.

====== Asia Minor ======
- At the start of the year, Asander (Antigonus' governor of Caria) rebels, forcing Antigonus (wintering with his main army in Phrygia) to invade Caria. Calling all his forces from their winter quarters, he divides them into four columns: the first is sent to take Miletus; the second, under his nephew Ptolemy, campaigns through central Caria from east to west; a third marches to and takes Theangela; Antigonus himself with the main army campaigns from north to south capturing Tralles, Iasus and Kaunos. Caria is taken in the space of weeks.
- Antigonus sends his nephew Telesphoros with an army of 5,000 infantry and 500 cavalry to mainland Greece to carry on the war against Cassander.

====== Greece/Macedon/Thrace ======
- The people of Epirus elevate Aeacides' brother, Alcetas, to the kingship.
- Alcetas advances on the Macedonian garrison of Acarnania under Lyciscus, a general of Cassander. Three battles are fought and a defeated Alcetas flees to a fortress in Epirus. Cassander marches the main Macedonian field army into Epirus and forces Alcetas to ally with him.
- Cassander marches on Apollonia, which people had driven out his garrison with the help of the Illyrians, but the Appolonians and Illyrians defeat him in battle, driving him out of western Greece for the time being.
- The people of Epirus, tired of Alcetas (who ruled Epirus harshly), rose up and murdered him and his sons.
- Telesphorus arrives in to the Peloponnese and starts expelling Cassander's garrisons. He successfully liberates all cities and towns that are being held for Cassander by Polyperchon and his son Alexander; all except Sicyon and Corinth who are being defended by Polyperchon and Alexander themselves.
- Cassander sails against the city of Oreus on Euboea with a fleet of 30 ships. He blockades its port trying to force the city's surrender.
- Telesphorus comes to the aid of Oreus from the Peloponnese with 20 ships and 1,000 infantry, while Antigonid admiral Medius sails to relieve Oreus with a 100 ships from Asia Minor; they break Cassander's blockade.
- Cassander receives reinforcements from Athens (under Thymochares the Sphettian, descendant of Thymochares) and defeats Telesphoros' squadron.
- Antigonus sends his nephew Ptolemy, whom he has made Strategos of Greece, with 5,000 infantry, 500 cavalry and 150 warships (he had recalled and reinforced Medius' fleet) to take command of all Antigonid forces and affairs in Greece.
- Cassander abandons the siege of Oreus, concentrating his forces at Chalcis to counter Ptolemy who has landed at Bathys in Boeotia and has been reinforced by the Boeotian League with 2,200 infantry and 1,300 cavalry.
- Antigonus marches his main field army to the Hellespontine region threatening to invade Europe and attack Macedon, forcing Cassander to retreat to Macedon to prepare its defences.
- Antigonus arrives at the Propontis and tries to negotiate an alliance with Byzantium, but the city, at the urging of Lysimachus, remains neutral; without it Antigonus gives up on the idea of crossing over into Europe.
- The Corcyraeans come to the aid of Apollonia and Epidamus and help the Apollonians and the people of Epidamus to remove the garrisons Cassander put there. They free Apollonia, but give the city of Epidamus to the Illyrian king Glaucias.
- Ptolemy captures Chalcis, removes Cassander's garrison, but does not install a garrison of his own. Eretria and Carystus, both on Euboea as well, join Antigonus' alliance. Ptolemy crosses over to mainland Greece and captures Oropos, again removing Cassander's garrison, he then hands it over to Antigonus' ally, the Boeotian League. After Oropos he invades Attica putting pressure on Athens to negotiate a truce. From Attica he marches on Thebes, captures it and removes Cassander's garrison. He moves on to Phocis, drives out Cassander's garrisons in that region as well, and moves into Opuntian Locris, where he besieges Opus.
- Telesphorus, who had been subordinated to Antigonus' other nephew Ptolemy considered this an insult and ends his friendship with Antigonus through betrayal.
- Telesphorus enters Elis, fortifies its citadel, and enslaves the city. He then marches on Olympia and plunders its sacred precinct collecting 500 talents; with his booty Telesphorus stars hiring mercenaries.
- Ptolemy soon restores the situation and persuades Telesphorus to give up his revolt.

====== Sicily ======
- Agathocles, tyrant of Syracuse, increased the size of his forces until they surpassed the Carthaginian garrison forces on the island.
- Carthage, concerned with Agathocles' increasing powers, decided to send 130 warships and 14,200 soldiers under the command of a general named Hamilcar (son of Gisco, grandson of Hanno the Great).
- Hamilcar's fleet was caught by several storms which sank 60 warships and destroyed 200 transports.
- After landing on Sicily, Hamilcar gathered the remnants of his army, he also started to hire mercenaries, enlist those Sicilians opposed to Agathocles and enroll soldiers from the Carthaginian garrisons already on Sicily. In this way he was able to muster a large army.
- Agathocles, fearing Gela would turn against him, took over the city, executed 4,000 leading Geloans he suspected of treason, and confiscated their property.

====== Italy ======
- The Second Samnite War continues: there are rumours of a mobilisation of the Etruscans; since the consul Marcus Valerius Maximus Corvus is campaigning in Samnium and his consular colleague Publius Decius Mus is to ill to lead an army, the people appoint Gaius Sulpicius Longus as dictator. Sulpicius appoints Gaius Junius Bubulcus Brutus as his Magister Equitum (Second-in-command). Sulpicius ' mission is to defend against the Etruscan invasion which never materialize; Sulpicius and Brutus remain in camp at Rome until the end of the campaigning season.
- The Roman censor, Appius Claudius Caecus, a patrician, enters office and begins construction of the Appian Way (the Via Appia) between Rome and Capua. He also embarks on a program of political reform, including the distribution of the landless citizens of Rome among the tribes, which at this time constitute basic political units. Appius also admits sons of freedmen into the Roman Senate. He also asserts the right of freed slaves to hold office.
- Rome gets its first pure drinking water as engineers complete the first aqueduct into the city, the Aqua Appia.

=== 311 BC ===
==== By place ====
====== Babylonia/Media/Susiana ======
- Upon entering Mesopotamia Seleucus manages to persuade some of the Macedonian veterans settled at Carrhae to join his cause. He then marches on to his old satrapy (province) of Babylonia gathering additional force along the way.
- Seleucus manages to persuade Polyarchus, the Antigonid commander of one of the local districts, to join his cause. Polyarchus joins Seleucus with 1,000 soldiers.
- The remaining Antigonid loyalists in Babylonia retreat to the citadel of Babylon. They also put Seleucus' remaining friends in Babylon there (under a strong guard). Seleucus besieges the citadel and manages to take it by storm.
- Nicanor, Antigonus' commander of the Upper Satrapies, marches against Seleucus from Media (where he was stationed) with 10,000 infantry and 7,000 cavalry. Seleucus hides his much smaller army (3,000 infantry and 400 cavalry) along Nicanor's line of march and launches a night attack on his camp, catching his opponent by surprise; Nicanor flees the ensuing battle while his army quickly surrenders.
- Seleucus marches to eastern Susiana and negotiates a treaty with the Cossaei (a warlike tribe) in the mountains between Susiana and Media.
- Seleucus reestablishes himself as satrap of Babylonia and asserts control over Media and Susiana (Elam).

====== Asia Minor/Syria/Palestina ======
- Ptolemy tries to occupy Syria; he himself campaigns in Coele Syria (southern Syria) while he sends Killes, one of his generals, into northern Syria to finish off the remnants of Demetrius Poliorcetes' army. Demetrius defeats Killes at Myus and Antigonus enters Syria in force. So, after only a few months, Ptolemy evacuates his forces from Syria.
- In view of the threat by Seleucus to his control of the East, Antigonus decides to make peace with all of his adversaries, except Seleucus, who now holds Babylon. All of the diadochi confirm the existing boundaries and the freedom of the Greek cities. Ptolemy and Lysimachus are confirmed as satraps of Egypt and Thrace, respectively, and Antigonus and Cassander are confirmed as commanders of the army in Asia and Europe. Antigonus, no longer regent but now titled the strategos (officer in charge) of the whole of Asia, rules in Syria from the Hellespont to the Euphrates, including Asia Minor.
- It is agreed by all parties that the young king Alexander IV of Macedon, son of Alexander the Great, will become king of the whole empire when he comes of age in six years' time.
- The peace agreement between the diadochi is soon violated. On the pretext that garrisons have been placed in some of the free Greek cities by Antigonus. Ptolemy and Cassander renew hostilities against him.
- Antigonus sends one of his generals, Athenaeus, with 4,000 light infantry and 600 cavalry to make a raid on Petra, the capital city of the Nabateans, to carry off hostages and possessions. The raid is initially successful, but a surprise attack by the Nabateans destroys Athenaeus' raiding force, only 50 horsemen escaping.
- Through clever diplomacy Antigonus is able to lull the Nabateans into a false sense of security. Demetrius, with a force of 4,000 light infantry and 4,000 cavalry, is sent to make another raid on Petra. The Nabateans, reacting quickly, are able to foil the attack. Demetrius negotiates terms with the Nabateans and returns to his father with hostages and gifts (including 700 camels)

====== Greece ======
- During the winter of 312/11 Antigonus' nephew Telesphorus, who had been subordinated to Antigonus' other nephew Ptolemy in 312, decides to rebel, considering his subordination to be insulting. Ptolemy is able to keep the situation under control and persuades Telesphorus to return to the fold.
- Cassander opens up negotiations with Ptolemy.

====== Italy ======
- The Second Samnite War continues, the Roman consuls Gaius Junius Bubulcus Brutus and Quintus Aemilius Barbula divide their command.

- Barbula campaigns against the Etruscans.
- Brutus campaigns against the Samnites.

- The Samnites take the Roman garrison of Cluviae and scourge their prisoners. Junius liberates the city and then moves on Bovianum and sacks it. The Samnites try to ambush the Romans, but the Romans are able to overcome their assailants.
- The Etruscans are besieging Sutrium, an ally which the Romans see as their key to Etruria. Barbula marches to their aid, and a battle is fought; the Romans start to gain the upper hand, but darkness stops the battle. Barbula's campaign ends indecisive.

====== Sicily ======
- The Carthaginian general Hamilcar crosses the Mediterranean with an army and wins the Battle of Himera against Agathocles, the tyrant of Syracuse.
- Hamilcar then proceeds with laying siege to Syracuse, where Agathocles had retreated.

=== 310 BC ===
==== By place ====
====== Greece/Macedonia ======
- Antigonid general Ptolemy forms an alliance with Cassander revolting against his uncle Antigonus

====== Cyprus ======
- By order of Ptolemy, Nicocles of Paphos kills himself.

====== Babylonia ======
- Antigonus orders Nicanor, one of his generals, to invade Babylonia from the east and his son Demetrius Poliorcetes to attack it from the west. Nicanor assembles a large force but is surprised and defeated by Seleucus at the river Tigris, and his troops are either cut to pieces or defect to the enemy. Similarly, Demetrius Poliorcetes fails to oust Seleucus.

====== Asia Minor ======
- Ptolemy attacks Cilicia, territory held by Antigonus.
- The cities of Antigonia Troas (later known as Alexandria Troas) and Antigoneia (later known as Nicaea) are founded by Antigonus I Monophthalmus.

====== Sicily and Africa ======
- The tyrant of Syracuse, Agathocles, escapes from the siege of the city by the Carthaginians with a fleet and carries the war with the Carthaginians back into his enemy's territory. He defeats the Carthaginians in the Battle of White Tunis.

====== Roman Republic ======
- Rome deals with renewed trouble from the Etruscans, who are persuaded by the Samnites to cease their alliance with the Romans. In the Battle of Lake Vadimo, the Romans under Fabius Maximus Rullianus defeat the Etruscans.

====== Illyria ======
- The Autariatae disappear due to Celtic migrations.

== Births ==
319 BC

- Antigonus II Gonatas, Macedonian king (approximate date) (d. 239 BC)
- Pyrrhus of Epirus, King of the Molossians, Epirus and Macedonia (d. 272 BC)

316 BC

- Arsinoe II, Queen of Thrace and later co-ruler of Egypt with her brother and husband Ptolemy II of Egypt (d. 270 BC)

315 BC

- Aratus, Macedonian Greek mathematician, astronomer, meteorologist, botanist and poet (d. 240 BC)

310 BC

- Aristarchus of Samos, Greek astronomer and mathematician (approximate date) (d. c. 230 BC)
- Huiwen of Zhao, Chinese king of Zhao (Warring States Period) (d. 266 BC)
- Xun Zi, Chinese philosopher (approximate date) (d. c. 230 BC)

== Deaths ==
319 BC

- Antipater, Macedonian general, regent of Alexander the Great's empire (b. 397 BC)

318 BC

- Phocion, Athenian statesman and general (b. c. 402 BC)
- Cleitus the White, Officer of Alexander the Great

317 BC

- King Philip III of Macedon (b. c. 359 BC)
- Queen Eurydice III of Macedon
- Nicanor Macedonian officer of Cassander and the son in law of Aristotle.
- Cleitus the White

316 BC

- Olympias, Epirote princess, wife of Macedonian king Philip II and the mother of Alexander the Great (b. c. 376 BC)
- Eumenes, Greek general and diadochi (b. c. (362 BC)
- Antigenes (general), Greek general
- Eudemus (general), Greek general
- Sun Bin, Chinese military strategist and general from the State of Qi

315 BC

- Zhou Shen Jing Wang, king of the Zhou dynasty of China

314 BC

- Xenocrates, Greek philosopher, pupil of Plato and head of the Greek Academy (b. 396 BC)
- Aeschines, Athenian orator and politician (b. 389 BC)
- Alexander (son of Polyperchon)

313 BC

- Aeacides, King of Epirus.
- Ptolemy, brother of Antigonus Monophthalmus.

312 BC

- Peithon (son of Agenor)

310 BC

- Roxana, Bactrian or Sogdian princess, widow of Alexander the Great
- Pytheas, Greek merchant, geographer and explorer from the Greek colony Massilia (today Marseille) (b. c. 380 BC)
- Nicocles (Paphos) king of Paphos
