= 313 BC =

313 BC in various calendars
Gregorian calendar	313 BC; CCCXIII BC
Ab urbe condita	441
Ancient Egypt era	XXXIII dynasty, 11
Pharaoh	Ptolemy I Soter, 11
Ancient Greek Olympiad (summer)	116th Olympiad, year 4
Assyrian calendar	4438
Balinese saka calendar	N/A
Bengali calendar	−906 – −905
Berber calendar	638
Buddhist calendar	232
Burmese calendar	−950
Byzantine calendar	5196–5197
Chinese calendar	丁未年 (Fire Goat); 2385 or 2178 — to — 戊申年 (Earth Monkey); 2386 or 2179
Coptic calendar	−596 – −595
Discordian calendar	854
Ethiopian calendar	−320 – −319
Hebrew calendar	3448–3449
- Hindu calendars
Vikram Samvat	−256 – −255
Shaka Samvat	N/A
Kali Yuga	2788–2789
Holocene calendar	9688
Iranian calendar	934 BP – 933 BP
Islamic calendar	963 BH – 962 BH
Javanese calendar	N/A
Julian calendar	N/A
Korean calendar	2021
Minguo calendar	2224 before ROC 民前2224年
Nanakshahi calendar	−1780
Thai solar calendar	230–231
Tibetan calendar	མེ་མོ་ལུག་ལོ་ (female Fire-Sheep) −186 or −567 or −1339 — to — ས་ཕོ་སྤྲེ་ལོ་ (male Earth-Monkey) −185 or −566 or −1338

Year 313 BC was a year of the pre-Julian Roman calendar. At the time, it was known as the Year of the Consulship of Cursor and Brutus (or, less frequently, year 441 Ab urbe condita). The denomination 313 BC for this year has been used since the early medieval period, when the Anno Domini calendar era became the prevalent method in Europe for naming years.

== Events ==
=== By place ===
==== Syria ====
- Antigonus sends Telesphorus to the Peloponnesus to free the cities.

==== Egypt ====
- Ptolemy, whose Egyptian kingdom includes Cyprus, puts down a revolt there.
- A revolt in Cyrene is also crushed.

==== Asia Minor ====
- Prepelaus arrives in Caria and starts making plans with Asander. They decide on a surprise attack on Ptolemy, the commander of Antigonus' forces in western Asia Minor. Eupolemus, one of Prepelaus' lieutenants, is sent with 8,000 infantry and 200 cavalry. However, some deserters from Eupolemus' strike force betray their plans to Ptolemy who quickly gathers 8,300 infantry and 600 cavalry from their winter quarters and marches against Eupolemus. In the middle of the night Ptolemy launches a surprise attack on Eupolemus' camp capturing the entire force with ease.
- Antigonus, after finding a pass across the Taurus Mountains that was still open, marches his main army into Asia Minor and goes into winter quarters in Celaenae in Phrygia. Meanwhile, Antigonus' admiral Medius is ordered to sail the new Antigonid fleet from Phoenicia into the Aegean. On route he captures one of Cassander's fleets (the one that had escorted Prepelaus to Asia Minor).
- Asander agrees to send all his soldiers to Antigonus to help keep Greek cities autonomous
- Asander sends emissaries to Ptolemy and Seleucus asking for help

==== Thrace ====
- In the spring of 313 a revolt against Lysimachus is under way in the Greek cities of the northwestern Black Sea coast. Callatis, Istria and Odessus rebel. The latter two are quickly taken by Lysimachus, but Callatis holds out. Antigonus sends a fleet and an army under a general named Pausanias to aid the city, he also persuades the Thracian king Seuthes to rebel. Lysimachus leaves part of his army to continue the siege, while he himself marches against Pausanias. He fights his way past Seuthes through the Haemus Mountains and captures Pausanias' force, enrolling them in his army. Pausanias is killed in battle, but most of his officers are ransomed back to Antigonus.

==== Greece ====
- Becoming tired of Macedonian rule, the people of Epirus recall their former king Aeacides (who until then had been campaigning with his old ally Polyperchon in the Peloponnese). Cassander immediately sends an army against him under his brother Philip, who is diverted from invading Aetolia.
- At the autumn meeting of the Aetolian League, Aristodemus of Miletus, Antigonus' top diplomat, is able to persuade the Aetolians to support Antigonus.
- Aristodemus and his mercenary army (recruited the year prior) cross over to the Peloponnese and fight Alexander, the son of Polyperchon, at Cyllene, and liberate Patrae and Aegium from Cassander's garrisons. Aristodemus then returns to Aetolia, leaving a sizeable force in the Pelopponese who help the city of Dyme eject its garrison, despite a failed intervention by Alexander.
- Philip marches into Acarnania to prevent Aeacides from linking up with the Aetolians. Philip defeats Aeacides in battle, killing many Epirotes and capturing 50 leading supporters of Aeacides, sending them as prisoners to Macedon. Aeacides, with the remnant of his forces, joins the Aetolians. Philip catches up to Aeacides and the Aetolians at Oeniadae and defeats them in battle. Aeacides, who was wounded in the Battle of Oeniadae, dies a few days later. The remaining Aetolian army takes refuge in the surrounding mountains.
- Cassander, hearing of Aristodemus' success with the Aetolians, marches south in force, persuades the Acarnanians to ally with him, and campaigns successfully along the Adriatic coast; capturing Apollonia and defeating the Illyrian king Glaucius. At the end of the year Cassander returns to Macedon.
- With his western border thus strengthened, Cassander sends Prepelaus, one of his top generals, with an army to Asia Minor to aid his ally Asander.
- Cassander orders Dionysius (the commander of his garrison in Athens) and Demetrius of Phalerum (the tyrant of Athens) to send a fleet of 20 warships to try and recapture Lemnos. An Athenian strategos named Aristoteles is sent, ravaging the island in conjunction with Seleucus (who was sent into the Aegean by Ptolemy). After Seleucus sails away, Aristoteles is attacked by the Antigonid fleet, most of his ships being captured.

==== Italy ====
- The Samnites take Fregellae in Latium, the Roman dictator Gaius Poetelius Libo Visolus marches his army from Rome and moves to retake it, but the Samnites leave at night; Visolus places a garrison in the city.
- The consul Gaius Junius Bubulcus Brutus is credited with the capture of Nola, Atina, and Calatia by some sources.

- The Romans capture Nola by setting fire to the buildings near the city walls and storming the city after the walls collapse.

- The Romans establish colonies at the Volscian island of Pontiae, the Volscian town of Interamna Sucasina and at Suessa Aurunca.

==== Sicily ====
- Deinocrates, the leader of the Syracusan exiles, sends envoys to the Carthaginians to ask them for help against Agathocles, the tyrant of Syracuse. The Carthaginians, fearing for their own possessions in Sicily, send a large force to the island.
- The exiles send Nymphodorus (a friend of Deinocrates) with some soldiers to take Centoripini (some of whose elite had promised to assist the exiles in taking the city). Nymphodorus is killed in the failed attempt to capture the city. Agathocles executes everyone he suspects of sedition in the city.

== Deaths ==
- Aeacides, King of Epirus.
- Ptolemy, brother of Antigonus Monophthalmus.

== Sources ==
=== Ancient Sources ===
- Diodorus Siculus, Bibliotheca Historica, volume 19.
- Livy, History of Rome, volume 9.
