= 315 BC =

315 BC in various calendars
- Gregorian calendar: 315 BC; CCCXV BC
- Ab urbe condita: 439
- Ancient Egypt era: XXXIII dynasty, 9
- Pharaoh: Ptolemy I Soter, 9
- Ancient Greek Olympiad (summer): 116th Olympiad, year 2
- Assyrian calendar: 4436
- Balinese saka calendar: N/A
- Bengali calendar: −908 – −907
- Berber calendar: 636
- Buddhist calendar: 230
- Burmese calendar: −952
- Byzantine calendar: 5194–5195
- Chinese calendar: 乙巳年 (Wood Snake); 2383 or 2176 — to — 丙午年 (Fire Horse); 2384 or 2177
- Coptic calendar: −598 – −597
- Discordian calendar: 852
- Ethiopian calendar: −322 – −321
- Hebrew calendar: 3446–3447
- Hindu calendars
- Vikram Samvat: −258 – −257
- Shaka Samvat: N/A
- Kali Yuga: 2786–2787
- Holocene calendar: 9686
- Iranian calendar: 936 BP – 935 BP
- Islamic calendar: 965 BH – 964 BH
- Javanese calendar: N/A
- Julian calendar: N/A
- Korean calendar: 2019
- Minguo calendar: 2226 before ROC 民前2226年
- Nanakshahi calendar: −1782
- Thai solar calendar: 228–229
- Tibetan calendar: ཤིང་མོ་སྦྲུལ་ལོ་ (female Wood-Snake) −188 or −569 or −1341 — to — མེ་ཕོ་རྟ་ལོ་ (male Fire-Horse) −187 or −568 or −1340

Year 315 BC was a year of the pre-Julian Roman calendar. At the time, it was known as the Year of the Consulship of Cursor and Philo (or, less frequently, year 439 Ab urbe condita). The denomination 315 BC for this year has been used since the early medieval period, when the Anno Domini calendar era became the prevalent method in Europe for naming years.

== Events ==
=== By place ===
==== Macedonian Empire ====
- Antigonus claims authority over most of Asia, seizes the treasury at Susa and enters Babylon, where Seleucus is governor. Seleucus flees to Ptolemy in Egypt and enters into a league with him, Lysimachus (the ruler of Thrace) and Cassander, against Antigonus. This leads to the First Coalition War.
- Aristodemus of Miletus, by order of Antigonus, sails to Laconia, where he receives permission from the Spartans to recruit 8000 mercenaries. He also meets Alexander and Polyperchon, thus establishing friendship between them and Antigonus
- Polyperchon is appointed general of the Peloponnesus
- Alexander (son of Polyperchon) sails to Antigonus in Asia. They make a pact of friendship and, by order of Antigonus, Alexander sails back to the Peloponnesus
- Peithon consolidates his power base in the eastern part of the Empire.
- Antigonus drives out Cassander's Macedonian forces of occupation from the Greek islands and forms the island cities in the Aegean into the "League of the Islanders", preparatory to his invasion of Greece. His ally, the city of Rhodes, furnishes him with the necessary fleet.

==== Greece ====
- The King of Epirus, Aeacides, faces a revolt from his people and they drive him from the kingdom. His son, Phyrrhus, who is then only two years old, is saved from being killed by some faithful servants. Cassander takes control of Epirus.
- In Macedonia the port city of Thessaloniki is founded by Cassander and named after his wife Thessalonike.
- Cassander appoints Apollonides as Governor of Argos
- Apollonides initiates a raid on Arcadia during the night.
- Cassander sends Prepelaus to Alexander (son of Polyperchon) and he convinces Alexander to desert Antigonus by offering command of all the Peloponnesus and making him general of an army

==== Cyprus ====
- Ptolemy's armies fight supporters of Antigonus in Cyprus. Ptolemy is able to re-conquer the island.

==== Sicily ====
- Agathocles, the tyrant of Syracuse, seizes the city of Messina.

==== Roman Republic ====
- The Romans take Ferentum, a city of Apulia, and this pushes the citizens of Nuceria to end their friendship with Rome.
- The Samnites defeat a Roman army led by dictator Quintus Fabius Maximus Rullianus at the Battle of Lautulae.

=== India ===
- The Indian king Porus, ally of Alexander the Great, is killed by Eudemus, another general of Alexander. The son of Porus, Malayketu, seizes his territory back by killing Eudemus.

== Births ==
- Aratus, Macedonian Greek mathematician, astronomer, meteorologist, botanist and poet (d. 240 BC)

== Deaths ==
- Zhou Shen Jing Wang, king of the Zhou dynasty of China
