= 314 BC =

314 BC in various calendars
| Gregorian calendar | 314 BC; CCCXIV BC |
| Ab urbe condita | 440 |
| Ancient Egypt era | XXXIII dynasty, 10 |
| Pharaoh | Ptolemy I Soter, 10 |
| Ancient Greek Olympiad (summer) | 116th Olympiad, year 3 |
| Assyrian calendar | 4437 |
| Balinese saka calendar | N/A |
| Bengali calendar | −907 – −906 |
| Berber calendar | 637 |
| Buddhist calendar | 231 |
| Burmese calendar | −951 |
| Byzantine calendar | 5195–5196 |
| Chinese calendar | 丙午年 (Fire Horse); 2384 or 2177 — to — 丁未年 (Fire Goat); 2385 or 2178 |
| Coptic calendar | −597 – −596 |
| Discordian calendar | 853 |
| Ethiopian calendar | −321 – −320 |
| Hebrew calendar | 3447–3448 |
- Hindu calendars
| Vikram Samvat | −257 – −256 |
| Shaka Samvat | N/A |
| Kali Yuga | 2787–2788 |
| Holocene calendar | 9687 |
| Iranian calendar | 935 BP – 934 BP |
| Islamic calendar | 964 BH – 963 BH |
| Javanese calendar | N/A |
| Julian calendar | N/A |
| Korean calendar | 2020 |
| Minguo calendar | 2225 before ROC 民前2225年 |
| Nanakshahi calendar | −1781 |
| Thai solar calendar | 229–230 |
| Tibetan calendar | 阳火马年 (male Fire-Horse) −187 or −568 or −1340 — to — 阴火羊年 (female Fire-Goat) −186 or −567 or −1339 |

Year 314 BC was a year of the pre-Julian Roman calendar. At the time, it was known as the Year of the Consulship of Libo and Longus (or, less frequently, year 440 Ab urbe condita). The denomination 314 BC for this year has been used since the early medieval period, when the Anno Domini calendar era became the prevalent method in Europe for naming years.

== Events ==
=== By place ===
==== Macedonian Empire ====
- Aristodemus of Miletus convinces the common assembly of the Aetolians to support Antigonus
- Alexander, son of Polyperchon, is killed by Alexion of Sicyon. Alexander's wife Cratesipolis assumes power and holds his army together.
- Antigonus, the ruler of the Asian parts of the late Alexander the Great's empire, faces a coalition consisting of Cassander, the Macedonian regent; Lysimachus, the satrap of Thrace; and Ptolemy, the satrap of Egypt, who have taken the side of the ousted satrap of Babylon, Seleucus.
- Antigonus does not trust Peithon's growing power. So Antigonus tricks Peithon to come to his court, where Antigonus has him executed.
- Antigonus invades Syria, then under Ptolemy's control, and besieges and captures Tyre. Antigonus then occupies Syria, proclaiming himself regent.

==== Greece ====
- As Cassander fights to retain control over central Greece, Antigonus promises freedom to the Greek cities in a bid to gain support from them against Cassander.
- The Aetolians enter into an alliance with Antigonus, and the League of the Islanders is established under Antigonus' hegemony. Cassander marches against them with his allies Lysimachus, Ptolemy and Seleucus and destroys the city of Agrinio.

==== Roman Republic ====
- Success seems to be going the Samnites' way in their ongoing battles against the Romans. Campania is on the verge of deserting Rome. Peace is established between Rome and some Samnite towns.
- The Roman consuls march their combined army to Tarracina and defeat a Samnite army there; killing 10,000 Samnites in the battle and the subsequent pursuit.
- While the consuls are fighting the Samnites at Tarracina, the Romans elect Gaius Maenius as Dictator with Marcus Foslius Flaccinator as his Magister Equitum (Master-of-Horse, Second-in-Command) and send them into Campania at the head of a large army. When Maenius and Foslius arrive near Capua, the Campanians, hearing about the defeat of the Samnites at Tarracina, start negotiating terms with the Romans; they surrender those who are guilty of the uprising and in turn are reinstated in their alliance with Rome.

==== China ====
- Zhou Nan Wang becomes King of the Zhou dynasty of China.
- The city of Guilin is founded by the Qin dynasty.

== Deaths ==
- Xenocrates, Greek philosopher, pupil of Plato and head of the Greek Academy (b. 396 BC)
- Aeschines, Athenian orator and politician (b. 389 BC)
- Alexander (son of Polyperchon)
