= 312 BC =

312 BC in various calendars
- Gregorian calendar: 312 BC; CCCXII BC
- Ab urbe condita: 442
- Ancient Egypt era: XXXIII dynasty, 12
- Pharaoh: Ptolemy I Soter, 12
- Ancient Greek Olympiad (summer): 117th Olympiad (victor)¹
- Assyrian calendar: 4439
- Balinese saka calendar: N/A
- Bengali calendar: −905 – −904
- Berber calendar: 639
- Buddhist calendar: 233
- Burmese calendar: −949
- Byzantine calendar: 5197–5198
- Chinese calendar: 戊申年 (Earth Monkey); 2386 or 2179 — to — 己酉年 (Earth Rooster); 2387 or 2180
- Coptic calendar: −595 – −594
- Discordian calendar: 855
- Ethiopian calendar: −319 – −318
- Hebrew calendar: 3449–3450
- Hindu calendars
- Vikram Samvat: −255 – −254
- Shaka Samvat: N/A
- Kali Yuga: 2789–2790
- Holocene calendar: 9689
- Iranian calendar: 933 BP – 932 BP
- Islamic calendar: 962 BH – 961 BH
- Javanese calendar: N/A
- Julian calendar: N/A
- Korean calendar: 2022
- Minguo calendar: 2223 before ROC 民前2223年
- Nanakshahi calendar: −1779
- Seleucid era: 0/1 AG
- Thai solar calendar: 231–232
- Tibetan calendar: ས་ཕོ་སྤྲེ་ལོ་ (male Earth-Monkey) −185 or −566 or −1338 — to — ས་མོ་བྱ་ལོ་ (female Earth-Bird) −184 or −565 or −1337

Year 312 BC was a year of the pre-Julian Roman calendar. At the time, it was known as the Year of the Consulship of Corvus and Mus (or, less frequently, year 442 Ab urbe condita). The denomination 312 BC for this year has been used since the early medieval period, when the Anno Domini calendar era became the prevalent method in Europe for naming years.

== Events ==
=== By place ===
==== Cyrenaica ====
- The people of Cyrene in the Cyrenaica rise up in a revolt against Ptolemy, putting the Ptolemaic garrison, which occupies their citadel, under siege. After they execute Ptolemy's envoys, who came to bade them to cease their sedition, he sends Agis (one of his generals) with an army and Epaunetus (another general) with a fleet to put down the rebellion. Agis storms the city, captures the rebels, and sends the ringleaders to Alexandria.

==== Cyprus ====
- After putting down the revolt in Cyrene, Ptolemy sails to Cyprus with a great force. He arrests the rulers of Kition, Lapethus, Kyrenia, and Marion for being too friendly towards Antigonus and/or too hostile towards himself, he then establishes his friend Nicocreon of Salamis as strategos (governor-general) of Cyprus .

==== Syria/Mesopotamia/Babylonia ====
- Ptolemy raids Antigonus' territories in Cilicia and Syria, and then sails back to Egypt.
- At the end of the year, Ptolemy invades Antigonus' territories in Palestine with an army of 18,000 infantry and 4,000 cavalry. The resulting Battle of Gaza leads to a triumph for Ptolemy over Antigonus' son, Demetrius.
- Demetrius rallies the remnants of his army at Tripolis and summons reinforcements from the garrisons of upper Syria and Cilicia; he also writes his father, Antigonus, and urges him to send help. Meanwhile Ptolemy captures Acre, Joppa, Samaria and Sidon, and starts to besiege Tyre.
- Seleucus ceases his service to Ptolemy and returns to his former province, Babylonia. This event takes place on October 1 and becomes the starting point of the Seleucid era.

==== Asia Minor ====
- At the start of the year, Asander (Antigonus' governor of Caria) rebels, forcing Antigonus (wintering with his main army in Phrygia) to invade Caria. Calling all his forces from their winter quarters, he divides them into four columns: the first is sent to take Miletus; the second, under his nephew Ptolemy, campaigns through central Caria from east to west; a third marches to and takes Theangela; Antigonus himself with the main army campaigns from north to south capturing Tralles, Iasus and Kaunos. Caria is taken in the space of weeks.
- Antigonus sends his nephew Telesphoros with an army of 5,000 infantry and 500 cavalry to mainland Greece to carry on the war against Cassander.

==== Greece/Macedon/Thrace ====
- The people of Epirus elevate Aeacides' brother, Alcetas, to the kingship.
- Alcetas advances on the Macedonian garrison of Acarnania under Lyciscus, a general of Cassander. Three battles are fought and a defeated Alcetas flees to a fortress in Epirus. Cassander marches the main Macedonian field army into Epirus and forces Alcetas to ally with him.
- Cassander marches on Apollonia, which people had driven out his garrison with the help of the Illyrians, but the Appolonians and Illyrians defeat him in battle, driving him out of western Greece for the time being.
- The people of Epirus, tired of Alcetas (who ruled Epirus harshly), rose up and murdered him and his sons.
- Telesphorus arrives in to the Peloponnese and starts expelling Cassander's garrisons. He successfully liberates all cities and towns that are being held for Cassander by Polyperchon and his son Alexander; all except Sicyon and Corinth who are being defended by Polyperchon and Alexander themselves.
- Cassander sails against the city of Oreus on Euboea with a fleet of 30 ships. He blockades its port trying to force the city's surrender.
- Telesphorus comes to the aid of Oreus from the Peloponnese with 20 ships and 1,000 infantry, while Antigonid admiral Medius sails to relieve Oreus with a 100 ships from Asia Minor; they break Cassander's blockade.
- Cassander receives reinforcements from Athens (under Thymochares the Sphettian, descendant of Thymochares) and defeats Telesphoros' squadron.
- Antigonus sends his nephew Ptolemy, whom he has made Strategos of Greece, with 5,000 infantry, 500 cavalry and 150 warships (he had recalled and reinforced Medius' fleet) to take command of all Antigonid forces and affairs in Greece.
- Cassander abandons the siege of Oreus, concentrating his forces at Chalcis to counter Ptolemy who has landed at Bathys in Boeotia and has been reinforced by the Boeotian League with 2,200 infantry and 1,300 cavalry.
- Antigonus marches his main field army to the Hellespontine region threatening to invade Europe and attack Macedon, forcing Cassander to retreat to Macedon to prepare its defences.
- Antigonus arrives at the Propontis and tries to negotiate an alliance with Byzantium, but the city, at the urging of Lysimachus, remains neutral; without it Antigonus gives up on the idea of crossing over into Europe.
- The Corcyraeans come to the aid of Apollonia and Epidamus and help the Apollonians and the people of Epidamus to remove the garrisons Cassander put there. They free Apollonia, but give the city of Epidamus to the Illyrian king Glaucias.
- Ptolemy captures Chalcis, removes Cassander's garrison, but does not install a garrison of his own. Eretria and Carystus, both on Euboea as well, join Antigonus' alliance. Ptolemy crosses over to mainland Greece and captures Oropos, again removing Cassander's garrison, he then hands it over to Antigonus' ally, the Boeotian League. After Oropos he invades Attica putting pressure on Athens to negotiate a truce. From Attica he marches on Thebes, captures it and removes Cassander's garrison. He moves on to Phocis, drives out Cassander's garrisons in that region as well, and moves into Opuntian Locris, where he besieges Opus.
- Telesphorus, who had been subordinated to Antigonus' other nephew Ptolemy considered this an insult and ends his friendship with Antigonus through betrayal.
- Telesphorus enters Elis, fortifies its citadel, and enslaves the city. He then marches on Olympia and plunders its sacred precinct collecting 500 talents; with his booty Telesphorus stars hiring mercenaries.
- Ptolemy soon restores the situation and persuades Telesphorus to give up his revolt.

==== Sicily ====
- Agathocles, tyrant of Syracuse, increased the size of his forces until they surpassed the Carthaginian garrison forces on the island.
- Carthage, concerned with Agathocles' increasing powers, decided to send 130 warships and 14,200 soldiers under the command of a general named Hamilcar (son of Gisco, grandson of Hanno the Great).
- Hamilcar's fleet was caught by several storms which sank 60 warships and destroyed 200 transports.
- After landing on Sicily, Hamilcar gathered the remnants of his army, he also started to hire mercenaries, enlist those Sicilians opposed to Agathocles and enroll soldiers from the Carthaginian garrisons already on Sicily. In this way he was able to muster a large army.
- Agathocles, fearing Gela would turn against him, took over the city, executed 4,000 leading Geloans he suspected of treason, and confiscated their property.

==== Italy ====
- The Second Samnite War continues: there are rumours of a mobilisation of the Etruscans; since the consul Marcus Valerius Maximus Corvus is campaigning in Samnium and his consular colleague Publius Decius Mus is to ill to lead an army, the people appoint Gaius Sulpicius Longus as dictator. Sulpicius appoints Gaius Junius Bubulcus Brutus as his Magister Equitum (Second-in-command). Sulpicius ' mission is to defend against the Etruscan invasion which never materialize; Sulpicius and Brutus remain in camp at Rome until the end of the campaigning season.
- The Roman censor, Appius Claudius Caecus, a patrician, enters office and begins construction of the Appian Way (the Via Appia) between Rome and Capua. He also embarks on a program of political reform, including the distribution of the landless citizens of Rome among the tribes, which at this time constitute basic political units. Appius also admits sons of freedmen into the Roman Senate. He also asserts the right of freed slaves to hold office.
- Rome gets its first pure drinking water as engineers complete the first aqueduct into the city, the Aqua Appia.

== Deaths ==
- Peithon (son of Agenor)

== Sources ==
=== Ancient Sources ===
- Diodorus Siculus, Bibliotheca Historica, volume XIX.
- Livy, Ab Urbe Condita (History of Rome), volume VIII.
