= Eupolemus (son of Simalus) =

4th-century BC Macedonian officer, general of Cassander

Satrap of Caria
- Reign: 294-286 (possibly into the 270s) BC
- Predecessor: Pleistarchus
- Father: Simalus

Eupolemus, son of Simalus (in Ancient Greek: Eυπόλεμoς Σίμαλου) was a Macedonian officer in the fourth century BC. He served the Antipatrids as a strategos during the later Wars of the Diadochi. Scholarship suggests that he acted as a deputy to Cassander's brother, Pleistarchus, and succeeded him in the rule of Caria.

== Asian Expedition ==
In 313 BC, Eupolemus accompanied Prepelaus as one of his lieutenants when Prepelaus was sent to aid Asander against Antigonus Monophthalmus in Asia Minor. After arriving in Caria (Asander's satrapy in Asia Minor), they started planning their campaign against Ptolemaeus, Antigonus's nephew and the commander of his forces in western Asia Minor. They decided upon a surprise attack during the winter (after the campaigning season had ended); Eupolemus was sent with 8,000 infantry and 200 cavalry to strike at Ptolemaeus after the latter had dispersed his forces into their winter quarters. However, some deserters from Eupolemus's strike force betrayed their plans to Ptolemaeus, who gathered 8,300 infantry and 600 cavalry from the nearest camps and marched against Eupolemus. In the middle of the night, Ptolemaeus launched a surprise attack on Eupolemus's camp, capturing the entire force, including Eupolemus. His captivity proved to be short-lived, as the next year (312 BC), Cassander named him strategos of Greece when he moved northward against Antigonus. Eupolemus worked closely with Pleistarchus who had been placed in control of Chalkis. Eupolemus next surfaces in 307 BC, fighting alongside Cassander and Pleistarchus in Attica.

== Dynast of Caria ==
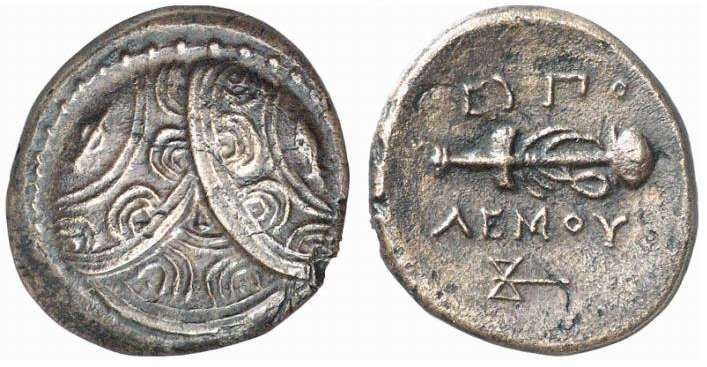
Bronze coin depicting three overlapping Macedonian shields, the outer two with spearheads in their centers / EYΠO-ΛEMOY, sword in a sheath, labrys (double axe) below; Mylasa mint. Struck under Eupolemos circa 295-280 BC

It has traditionally been assumed that this Eupolemus must have been the same as "Eupolemus, son of Potalus, the Macedonian" (Εὐπόλεμος Ποτάλου Μακεδών) noted from an inscription in Iasos, owing to both men being notable Macedonians in Caria and in possession of the same rare name. This discarded assumption previously led historians to erroneously believe that the Eupolemus who was Cassander's strategos of Greece had been awarded the title of proxenos and the epithet euergetes by the Isian people. According to Billows's chronology, Eupolemus served under Pleistarchus, the son of Antipater and brother of Cassander, from 313 BC until Pleistarchus's death. Eupolemos likely administered Caria during the first few years of its nominal rule by Pleistarchus. When Pleistarchus died, Eupolemus, having previously been his deputy, assumed control of a significant portion of Caria as an independent dynast. Eupolemos's rule of Caria is placed from 294 BC to at least 286 BC, although it may have continued well into the 270s. Eupolemus held sway over a significant portion of Caria, particularly in the west, and appears to have made Mylasa his capital. From here, he issued exclusively bronze coinage, usually depicting Macedonian shields on the obverse and a sheathed sword with EYΠO-ΛEMOY (Eupolemos) featured on the reverse. A labrys (a double axe associated with Caria) often appears on these coins. Eupolemus appears to have employed a significant number of mercenaries to maintain control over his spear-won land. His pragmatic policies of military colonization and heavy taxation may have provoked the ire of his subjects, likely contributing to the rebellion of his garrison at Theangela.

== Scholarly Debate ==
It is worth noting, however, that the chronology of Eupolemus's rule and his classification as a dynast is a matter of contention. Raymond Descat argues that the evidence used by Billows to support the notion of Eupolemus reigning over Caria as a dynast (coinage and inscriptions) has been misdated, originating during Eupolemus's initial Carian campaign, and cannot be used to prove that Eupolemus's position exceeded that of an ordinary strategos. A recent study by Richard J. Ashton has suggested that the coins minted under Eupolemus date to the early third century, rather than the 310s BC like Descat argued. Recent paleography has suggested that the Iasos inscription mentioning Eupolemus Pόtalou Μακεδών was likely from the 270s-260s BC, precluding it from referring to the Eupolemus who had served under Cassander. However, epigraphic evidence from a more recently discovered dedication from Iasos of an andron to Artemis Astias by Eupolemus, son of Simalus led Roberta Fabiani to conclude that the patronymic "Simalou" can thus be ascribed to Eupolemos with a reasonable degree of certainty that it refers to the man who was the general of Cassander. The engraving’s style dates the inscription to the early third century BC. Fabiani states that the sheer volume of attestations to Eupolemus disqualifies chronologies that place his period of power from only around 315–313 BC as a mere strategos and that he ought to be regarded as having become a dynast of Caria by the 290s BC.
