= Polygnota of Thebes =

Ancient Greek harpist

- Born: Thebes, Greece
- Occupation: Harpist
- Known for: Performing at the Pythian Games in Delphi in 86 BCE; granted proxeny by the city of Delphi
- Parent: Sokrates (father)
- Relatives: Lycides (cousin)
- Awards: Proxeny and 500 drachmae in gold, awarded by Delphi (86 BCE)

Polygnota of Thebes (fl. 86 BCE) was a professional harpist in ancient Greece. She is known from an inscription which commemorates her being granted the diplomatic privileges of proxeny in return for her performance at the Pythian Games in Delphi.

Polygnota's profession, khoropsaltriai, is only recorded of second- and first-century BCE women and indicates that she played a harp while a chorus danced. She came from a well-respected family in Thebes. In 86, she travelled to Delphi with her cousin Lycides, intending to play the harp for those celebrating the Pythian Games. Although the Games were cancelled because of the First Mithridatic War, she performed for the citizens for three days. She was rewarded with five hundred drachmas in gold and the civil and ritual privileges of the proxeny, including dining at the prytaneion. The award was recorded on the pillar of Eumenes II in Delphi.

== Inscription ==
God. Good fortune. When Habromachos [was archon], in the month of Boukatios, and the members of the council for the first [six months] were Stratagos, Kleon, Antiphilos and Damon; it was resolved by the city [of Delphi]: since Polygnota of Thebes, the daughter of Sokrates, who is a harpist {choropsaltria}, was residing in Delphi at the time [when] the Pythian games were due to be held; and although the games were [not] held because of the [war] that arose, she made a start on the same day and devoted the day to the god; and at the invitation of the archons and the citizens, she performed for three days and won great approval, in a manner worthy of the god and of the people of Thebes and [of] our city; and we crowned her with five hundred drachmas; therefore with good fortune it is resolved to praise Polygnota of Thebes, the daughter of Sokrates, for her piety towards the god and her holiness and her good attitude about her profession and her art; our city shall grant to her and her descendants proxeny, priority in consulting the oracle, priority in receiving justice, inviolability, freedom from taxes, privileges seating in the games that the city holds, the right to own land and buildings, and all the other honours that are given to other proxenoi and benefactors of the city; and to invite her to the public hearth in the prytaneion; and she shall be furnished with an offering to sacrifice to Apollo.
