= Eupolemus (disambiguation) =

Eupolemus may refer to:

== People ==
- Eupolemus (son of Simalus) was an Antipatrid general; he succeeded Pleistarchus in the rule of Caria.
- Eupolemus, a Jewish Historian
- Eupolemos of Argos was the name of a Greek architect who rebuilt the Heraion of Argos, a temple dedicated to Hera, after the original burned in 423 BCE
- Eupolemus of Elis, an athlete in Greece; there is a statue of Eupolemus of Elis that was created by Daedalus of Sicyon

== Other ==
- Eupolemus (bug) is a genus of shield bugs (i.e. insects of the subfamily Acanthosomatinae) such Eupolemus virescens native to Australia.
