= Myrmidon of Athens =

4th-century BCE Athenian mercenary commander, employed by Ptolemy I Soter

Myrmidon (Greek: Mυρμιδών; lived 4th century BC) was an Athenian who commanded a force of ten thousand mercenaries, which formed part of the reinforcements sent by Ptolemy, under the overall command of his brother Menelaus, to effect the reduction of Cyprus, in 315 BC. He was afterwards dispatched to the assistance of Asander in Caria, against the generals of Antigonus Monophthalmus. Evidently Myrmidon failed in Caria for Asander was reduced to sore straits by Antigonus's general Ptolemy (general).
