= Apollonides (governor of Argos) =

Ancient Greek governor

Apollonides (Ancient Greek: Ἀπολλωνίδης) or Apollonidas was governor of Argos in ancient Greece. He was raised to this office by Cassander. In the year 315 BCE, he invaded Arcadia, and got possession of the town of Stymphalus (modern Stymfalia). The majority of the Argives were hostile towards Cassander, and while Apollonides was engaged in Arcadia, they invited Alexander, the son of Polyperchon, and promised to surrender their town to him. But Alexander was not quick enough, and Apollonides, who seems to have been informed of the plan, suddenly returned to Argos. About 500 senators were at the time assembled in the prytaneum: Apollonides had all the doors of the house well guarded, that none of them might escape, and then set fire to it, so that all perished in the flames. The other Argives who had taken part in the conspiracy were partly exiled and partly put to death.
