= Prepelaus =

4th century BC Macedonian officer, general of Cassander

Prepelaus (Greek: Πρεπέλαος) (4th century BC) was a Macedonian officer in the service of Cassander and Lysimachus (who ruled over Macedon from 317 to 297 BC and became its king in 305 BC).

In 313 BC, Cassander sends Prepelaus with an army to Caria in Asia Minor to aid his ally Asander. After arriving in Caria Prepelaus starts making plans with Asander. They decide on a surprise attack on Ptolemy, the commander of Antigonus' forces in western Asia Minor. Eupolemus, one of Prepelaus' lieutenants, is sent with 8,000 infantry and 200 cavalry. However, some deserters from Eupolemus' strike force betray their plans to Ptolemy who quickly gathers 8,300 infantry and 600 cavalry from their winter quarters and marches against Eupolemus. In the middle of the night Ptolemy launches a surprise attack on Eupolemus' camp capturing the entire force with ease. In 315 BC, he was sent by Cassander on an ultimately successful mission to persuade Alexander, the son of Polyperchon, to desert Antigonus and join Cassander's alliance. Prepelaus is mentioned in 303 BC, when he held the important fortress of Corinth with a large force, but was unable to prevent its fall at the hands of Demetrius, and narrowly escaped capture. In the following summer (302 BC) he was successful in joint ventures with Lysimachus in Asia Minor, where he reduced the key cities of Adramyttium, Ephesus, and Sardis, and conquered the majority of Aeolia and Ionia. Ultimately, Demetrius was able to recover most of the lands captured by Prepelaus before the close of the same autumn. In 301 BC, Prepelaus fought in the decisive Battle of Ipsus, the battle where Antigonus was defeated and died.

== Sources ==
=== Ancient Sources ===
- Diodorus Siculus, Bibliotheca Historica.

=== Modern Sources ===
- Billows, Richard A. (1990). Antigonos the One-Eyed and the Creation of the Hellenistic State. Berkeley and Los Angeles, California: University of California Press. ISBN 0-520-20880-3.
- Smith, William (editor); Dictionary of Greek and Roman Biography and Mythology, "Prepelaus", Boston, (1867)
- Laale, Hans Willer (2011-11-04). Ephesus (Ephesos): An Abbreviated History From Androclus to Constantine XI. WestBow Press. p. 112. ISBN 9781449716189.
