= Siege of Megalopolis =

Siege in Greece by Polyperchon, 317 BC

- Part of Wars of the Diadochi
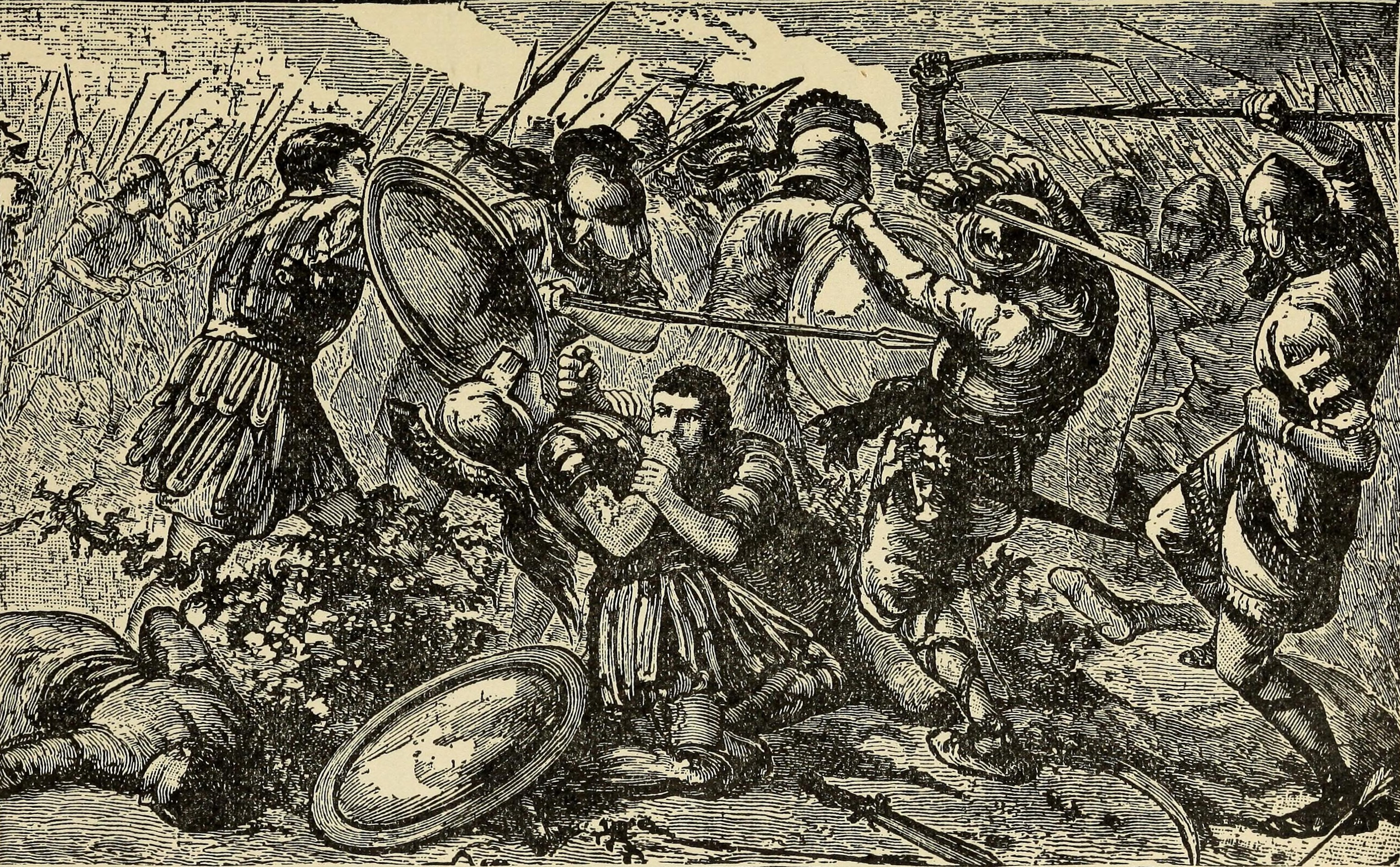
- Polyperchon's Army Driven Back at Megalopolis, 317 BC (1854 engraving)
Date	317 BCE
Location	Megalopolis, Greece
Result	Megalopolitan victory

Belligerents
Macedonia	Megalopolis

Commanders and leaders
Polyperchon	Damis

Strength
24,000 infantry 1,000 cavalry 65 elephants	15,000 militia

The siege of Megalopolis was a siege battle during the Second War of the Diadochi between Polyperchon, the Regent of the Macedonian Empire, and the people of Megalopolis who supported Polyperchon's rival Cassander. The siege failed and Polyperchon lost a lot of prestige, which was capitalized on by Cassander and his ally Antigonus.

== Background ==
After the death of Alexander the Great in 323 BC, his generals immediately began squabbling over his huge empire. Soon it degenerated into open warfare, with each general attempting to claim a portion of Alexander's vast empire for himself. These wars were called the Wars of the Diadochi and would last for decades (321-281 BCE). At the end of the First War, at the partition of the empire at Triparadeisos, Antipater had been made Regent of the Empire, he would represent the kings: Philip III (Alexander's mentally defective half-brother) and Alexander IV (Alexander's son by Roxane). Antipater died in 319 BCE, but just before he died he had nominated Polyperchon to be his replacement as regent. Antipater's son Cassander, enraged at not having been made his father's successor, soon fell out with Polyperchon, fled to Asia Minor and got the backing of Antigonus Monophthalmus, the strategos of Asia. Cassander also had a lot of support in Greece, through the Macedonian garrison commanders and the Greek tyrants and oligarchs placed in control of the Greek city-states by his father. Polyperchon decided to go to Greece himself and try and weaken Cassander's position.

== Prelude ==
Polyperchon first marched on Athens, where he tried to get control of the fortress of Munychia and the harbor of Pireaus. In this he was thwarted by Nicanor, the commander of the Macedonian garrison, and Cassander, who had just arrived with reinforcements from Asia Minor. A long siege was inevitable. Polyperchon left the siege of Munychia and Pireaus to a subordinate and marched his main army into the Peloponnese. Although most cities on the Peloponnese had sided with him, the influential city of Megalopolis had sided with Cassander.

== Siege ==
At that time Megalopolis was ruled by an oligarchy under Damis (a veteran of Alexander's campaigns). Damis did not recognize Polyperchon as the new regent and had joined Cassander's coalition. When Polyperchon arrived at Megalopolis he established two camps in front of the city, one for his Macedonian troops, one for his allies. He had wooden siege towers constructed and had his engineers dig tunnels under the walls to bring them down.

Eventually three towers and part of the wall came down. Polyperchon then ordered his men to attack the city through the breaches. The defenders were able to hold the breaches and after a lot of hard fighting the attackers withdrew with heavy losses. During the night the defenders build stockades in the breaches and stationed archers and catapults on them to keep the enemy at bay.

Polyperchon's casualties rose and he decided to use extreme measures, by sending his war elephants against the stockades. Damis must have had some intelligence on this because during the night he had iron spikes, hooks and nails attached to the stockades. The next day, when Polyperchon's elephant assault began, Damis had his men retreat from the stockades and had them fire their bows and catapults from the adjacent walls (he did not want his men to face a direct assault by elephants because of the psychological effect). When the elephants reached the stockades they tried to rip them down, but because of the spikes, hooks and nails they hurt their trunks, then panicked and fled. The elephant stampede caused further casualties and took the fight from Polyperchon's army. After a few weeks Polyperchon ended the siege and marched back to Athens.

== Aftermath ==
The failed siege of Megalopolis damaged Polyperchon's reputation and several Greek cities went over to Cassander. Their cause strengthened because Cassander and Antigonus went on the offensive. Antigonus defeated Polyperchon's fleet at Byzantium. Eventually Cassander was able to drive Polyperchon from Macedon and became the dominant power in the European part of the Macedonian Empire. Polyperchon was reduced to a minor contender in the Wars of the Diadochi.
