= 316 BC =

316 BC in various calendars
- Gregorian calendar: 316 BC; CCCXVI BC
- Ab urbe condita: 438
- Ancient Egypt era: XXXIII dynasty, 8
- Pharaoh: Ptolemy I Soter, 8
- Ancient Greek Olympiad (summer): 116th Olympiad (victor)¹
- Assyrian calendar: 4435
- Balinese saka calendar: N/A
- Bengali calendar: −909 – −908
- Berber calendar: 635
- Buddhist calendar: 229
- Burmese calendar: −953
- Byzantine calendar: 5193–5194
- Chinese calendar: 甲辰年 (Wood Dragon); 2382 or 2175 — to — 乙巳年 (Wood Snake); 2383 or 2176
- Coptic calendar: −599 – −598
- Discordian calendar: 851
- Ethiopian calendar: −323 – −322
- Hebrew calendar: 3445–3446
- Hindu calendars
- Vikram Samvat: −259 – −258
- Shaka Samvat: N/A
- Kali Yuga: 2785–2786
- Holocene calendar: 9685
- Iranian calendar: 937 BP – 936 BP
- Islamic calendar: 966 BH – 965 BH
- Javanese calendar: N/A
- Julian calendar: N/A
- Korean calendar: 2018
- Minguo calendar: 2227 before ROC 民前2227年
- Nanakshahi calendar: −1783
- Thai solar calendar: 227–228
- Tibetan calendar: ཤིང་ཕོ་འབྲུག་ལོ་ (male Wood-Dragon) −189 or −570 or −1342 — to — ཤིང་མོ་སྦྲུལ་ལོ་ (female Wood-Snake) −188 or −569 or −1341

Year 316 BC was a year of the pre-Julian Roman calendar. At the time, it was known as the Year of the Consulship of Rutilus and Laenas (or, less frequently, year 438 Ab urbe condita). The denomination 316 BC for this year has been used since the early medieval period, when the Anno Domini calendar era became the prevalent method in Europe for naming years.

== Events ==
=== By place ===
==== Macedonian Empire ====
- Eumenes and Antigonus, rivals to Cassander for control of Macedonia, meet in the Battle of Gabiene in Media to the northeast of Susa. Antigonus defeats Eumenes, with the aid of Seleucus and Peithon (the satraps of Babylonia and Media, respectively). The result is inconclusive. However, some of Eumenes' soldiers take matters into their own hands. Learning that Antigonus has captured many of their wives, children and the cumulative plunder of nearly 40 years of continuous warfare, they secretly open negotiations with Antigonus for their safe return. They hand over Eumenes and his senior officers to Antigonus in return for their baggage and families. Eumenes is put to death by Antigonus after a week's captivity.

==== Greece ====
- Cassander returns from the Peloponnesus and defeats Macedonia's regent Polyperchon in battle. Cassander blockades Olympias, mother of the late Alexander the Great, in Pydna, where she surrenders. Cassander takes Roxana and her son Alexander IV of Macedon into his custody.
- Olympias is condemned to death by Cassander, but his soldiers refuse to carry out the sentence. She is eventually killed by relatives of those she has previously had executed.
- Cassander marries Thessaloniki, half-sister of Alexander the Great. He has Alexander's widow, Roxana and son, Alexander IV of Macedon, imprisoned at Amphipolis in Thrace. They are never to be seen alive again.
- Cassander founds, on Pallenê, a city called Cassandreia
- Thebes, which has been destroyed by Alexander the Great, begins to be rebuilt by Cassander with the help of the citizens of Athens.
- In Rhodes (city), a major flood occurs. At least five hundred people die and many houses collapse.

==== Sicily ====
- Agathocles, the new tyrant of Syracuse, extends his rule over the eastern part of the island.

==== Roman Republic ====
- The Romans, with an eye to capturing Apulia, send an army (led by dictator Quintus Fabius Maximus Rullianus) to seize the town of Lucera from the Samnites. They are badly beaten in the Battle of Lautulae and the Samnites go on to reach within 32 kilometres of Rome.

==== China ====
- King Hui of Qin decides, on the advice of General Sima Cuo, to invade and annex the ancient states of Ba and Shu in Sichuan, in order to increase Qin's agricultural output and obtain a strategic platform from which to defeat the state of Chu.

== Births ==
- Arsinoe II, Queen of Thrace and later co-ruler of Egypt with her brother and husband Ptolemy II of Egypt (d. 270 BC)

== Deaths ==
- Olympias, Epirote princess, wife of Macedonian king Philip II and the mother of Alexander the Great (b. c. 376 BC)
- Eumenes, Greek general and diadochi (b. c. (362 BC)
- Antigenes (general), Greek general
- Eudemus (general), Greek general
- Sun Bin, Chinese military strategist and general from the State of Qi
