= 362 BC =

362 BC in various calendars
- Gregorian calendar: 362 BC; CCCLXII BC
- Ab urbe condita: 392
- Ancient Egypt era: XXX dynasty, 19
- Pharaoh: Djedhor, 1
- Ancient Greek Olympiad (summer): 104th Olympiad, year 3
- Assyrian calendar: 4389
- Balinese saka calendar: N/A
- Bengali calendar: −955 – −954
- Berber calendar: 589
- Buddhist calendar: 183
- Burmese calendar: −999
- Byzantine calendar: 5147–5148
- Chinese calendar: 戊午年 (Earth Horse); 2336 or 2129 — to — 己未年 (Earth Goat); 2337 or 2130
- Coptic calendar: −645 – −644
- Discordian calendar: 805
- Ethiopian calendar: −369 – −368
- Hebrew calendar: 3399–3400
- Hindu calendars
- Vikram Samvat: −305 – −304
- Shaka Samvat: N/A
- Kali Yuga: 2739–2740
- Holocene calendar: 9639
- Iranian calendar: 983 BP – 982 BP
- Islamic calendar: 1013 BH – 1012 BH
- Javanese calendar: N/A
- Julian calendar: N/A
- Korean calendar: 1972
- Minguo calendar: 2273 before ROC 民前2273年
- Nanakshahi calendar: −1829
- Thai solar calendar: 181–182
- Tibetan calendar: ས་ཕོ་རྟ་ལོ་ (male Earth-Horse) −235 or −616 or −1388 — to — ས་མོ་ལུག་ལོ་ (female Earth-Sheep) −234 or −615 or −1387

Year 362 BC was a year of the pre-Julian Roman calendar. At the time, it was known as the Year of the Consulship of Ahala and Aventinensis (or, less frequently, year 392 Ab urbe condita). The denomination 362 BC for this year has been used since the early medieval period, when the Anno Domini calendar era became the prevalent method in Europe for naming years.

== Events ==
=== By place ===
==== Persian Empire ====
- Mausolus of Caria joins the revolt of the satraps of Anatolia against the Persian king Artaxerxes II.

==== Egypt ====
- King Agesilaus II of Sparta arrives with 1,000 men to assist Egypt in its fight with Persia.

==== Greece ====
- The outbreak of civil war in the Arcadian league leads to Mantinea fighting alongside Sparta and Athens, while Tegea and other members of the league side with Thebes. The Theban general, Epaminondas leads the large allied army into the Peloponnesus, he is met by the Spartans (led by the Agiad Spartan king Agesilaus), Mantineans, Athenians, and their allies in the Battle of Mantinea. In the battle, Epaminondas is victorious, but is killed. His dying command to make peace with the enemy is followed by all sides and a general peace is established in Greece. The period of Theban domination of Greece comes to an end.

==== China ====
- The states of Qin, Han and Zhao defeat the state of Wei and Qin captures the prince of Wei. The Battle of Shaoliang is then fought between Qin and Wei, which Wei loses, whereupon Qin captures the prime minister of Wei.

== Births ==
- Eumenes of Cardia, Greek general and scholar (d. 316 BC)

== Deaths ==
- Epaminondas of Thebes, Greek general and statesman (b. c. 418 BC)
- Duke Xian of Qin, ruler of the Zhou dynasty state of Qin
- Datames, satrap of Cappadocia and military leader
