= Acestorides =

Acestorides (Ancient Greek: Ακεστορίδης) is the name of several people from Classical history:

- Acestorides of Corinth (fl. 4th century BC) was a Corinthian who was elected general of Syracuse in 320 BC. After Agathocles was reputed to have attempted to establish a tyranny, Acestorides ordered him to leave the city and secretly sent men to assassinate him on the road. Agathocles escaped the plot and went into exile. Acestorides left Syracuse in 319 BC, after which Sostratus assumed leadership of the city until Agathocles returned and seized Syracuse in 317 BC.
- Another Acestorides, whose date is unknown, wrote four books of mythical stories relating to every city (των κατά πόλιν μυθικων). In these he gave many real historical accounts, as well as those merely fantastical, but he entitled them μυθικά ("myths") to avoid calumny and to indicate the pleasant nature of the work. It was compiled from Conon, Apollodorus, Protagoras and others.
