= 396 BC =

396 BC in various calendars
- Gregorian calendar: 396 BC; CCCXCVI BC
- Ab urbe condita: 358
- Ancient Egypt era: XXIX dynasty, 3
- Pharaoh: Nepherites I, 3
- Ancient Greek Olympiad (summer): 96th Olympiad (victor)¹
- Assyrian calendar: 4355
- Balinese saka calendar: N/A
- Bengali calendar: −989 – −988
- Berber calendar: 555
- Buddhist calendar: 149
- Burmese calendar: −1033
- Byzantine calendar: 5113–5114
- Chinese calendar: 甲申年 (Wood Monkey); 2302 or 2095 — to — 乙酉年 (Wood Rooster); 2303 or 2096
- Coptic calendar: −679 – −678
- Discordian calendar: 771
- Ethiopian calendar: −403 – −402
- Hebrew calendar: 3365–3366
- Hindu calendars
- Vikram Samvat: −339 – −338
- Shaka Samvat: N/A
- Kali Yuga: 2705–2706
- Holocene calendar: 9605
- Iranian calendar: 1017 BP – 1016 BP
- Islamic calendar: 1048 BH – 1047 BH
- Javanese calendar: N/A
- Julian calendar: N/A
- Korean calendar: 1938
- Minguo calendar: 2307 before ROC 民前2307年
- Nanakshahi calendar: −1863
- Thai solar calendar: 147–148
- Tibetan calendar: ཤིང་ཕོ་སྤྲེ་ལོ་ (male Wood-Monkey) −269 or −650 or −1422 — to — ཤིང་མོ་བྱ་ལོ་ (female Wood-Bird) −268 or −649 or −1421

Year 396 BC was a year of the pre-Julian Roman calendar. At the time, it was known as the Year of the Tribunate of Saccus, Capitolinus, Esquilinus, Augurinus, Capitolinus and Priscus (or, less frequently, year 358 Ab urbe condita). The denomination 396 BC for this year has been used since the early medieval period, when the Anno Domini calendar era became the prevalent method in Europe for naming years.

== Events ==
=== By place ===
==== Persian Empire ====
- The Persians assemble a joint Phoenician, Cilician, and Cypriot fleet, under the command of the experienced Athenian admiral, Conon, and seize Rhodes.

==== Carthage ====
- The Carthaginians are forced to abandon their siege of Syracuse (begun in 398 BC) due to a plague, but destroy Messina. Dionysius' first war with Carthage ends with a notable victory for Dionysius, who confines his enemy's power to an area of northwest Sicily. On his return home, the Carthaginian general, Himilco, commits suicide.

==== Greece ====
- Agesilaus II, the King of Sparta, campaigns successfully in Asia Minor against the Persian satraps Pharnabazus and Tissaphernes and inflicts a major defeat on Tissaphernes at Sardis. Agesilaus agrees to a three months' truce with the Persians under Tissaphernes, the satrap of Lydia and Caria. Negotiations conducted during that time prove fruitless, and on its termination, Agesilaus raids Phrygia, where he easily captures an immense amount of booty, since Tissaphernes has concentrated his troops in Caria.

==== Roman Republic ====
- Marcus Furius Camillus is made dictator by the Romans. Camillus finally destroys the Etruscan city of Veii in southern Etruria as the town falls to Roman forces after what is said to be a 10 year siege. The capture of Veii and its surrounding territories marks the first major expansion of Rome which doubles its territory after this victory.

=== By topic ===
==== Literature ====
- Plato publishes his Apologia, which is a defence of his mentor Socrates. (Approximate date.)

==== Sports ====
- Kyniska becomes the first woman to win an event at the Olympic Games when the horse-drawn chariot she sponsors crosses the finish line first, even though the prohibition on women competing forces her to hire a man to drive it.

== Births ==
- Xenocrates, Greek philosopher and scholarch (or rector) of the Academy (d. 314 BC)

== Deaths ==
- Himilco, Carthaginian general.
