= Proxeny =

Voluntary diplomatic position in classical Greece

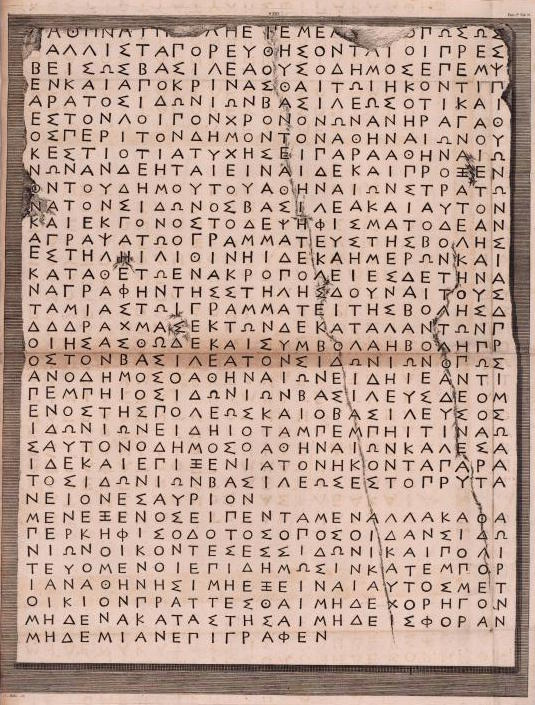
Inscription in honor of Straton, King of Sidon, giving him the title of proxenos: "Also Straton the king of Sidon shall be proxenos of the People of Athens, both himself and his descendants". Acropolis of Athens. This indicates that relations of proxeny existed not only among Greek cities but also with non-Greeks (Phoenicians in this case).

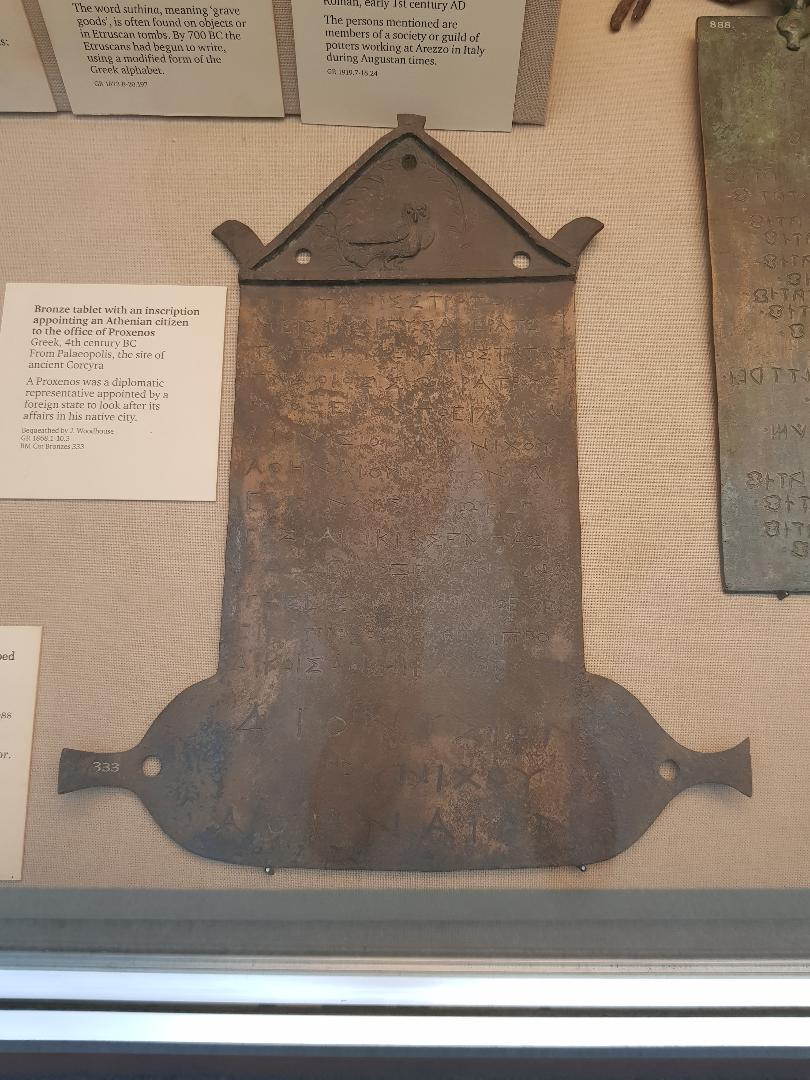
Bronze plaque with inscription appointing an Athenian citizen to Proxenos, from Palaeopolis in ancient Corcyra, Greece, 4th Century BC, British Museum

Proxeny or proxenia (Ancient Greek: προξενία) in ancient Greece was an arrangement whereby a citizen (chosen by the city) hosted foreign ambassadors at his own expense, in return for honorary titles from the state. The citizen was called proxenos (πρόξενος; plural: proxenoi or proxeni, "instead of a foreigner") or proxeinos (πρόξεινος). The proxeny decrees, which amount to letters patent and resolutions of appreciation were issued by one state to a citizen of another for service as proxenos, a kind of honorary consul looking after the interests of the other state's citizens. A common phrase is euergetes (benefactor) and proxenos (πρόξεινος τε ειη και ευεργέτης).

A proxenos would use whatever influence he had in his own city to promote policies of friendship or alliance with the city he voluntarily represented. For example, Cimon was Sparta's proxenos at Athens and during his period of prominence in Athenian politics, previous to the outbreak of the First Peloponnesian War, he strongly advocated a policy of cooperation between the two states. Cimon was known to be so fond of Sparta that he named one of his sons Lacedaemonius (as Sparta was known as Lacedaemon in antiquity).

Being another city's proxenos did not preclude taking part in war against that city, should it break out – since the proxenos' ultimate loyalty was to his own city. However, a proxenos would naturally try his best to prevent such a war and to resolve the differences that were threatening to cause it. And once peace negotiations were on the way, a proxenos' contacts and goodwill in the enemy city could be profitably used by his city.

The position of proxenos for a particular city was often hereditary in a particular family.

A 2024 study in the Journal of Economic History linked the presence of proxeny arrangements to increases in trade flows.

== In Delos ==
Delos was known as an independent city-state with a major sanctuary and port in the Greek world, a commercial centre and a religious centre that attracted many visitors from within and outside the Greek world. As the birthplace of Apollo, Delos held pan-Hellenic religious significance, making its decrees symbolically authoritative. During the Hellenistic era, Delos allowed non-Greek rituals to be performed, and both Greeks and non-Greeks came to offer sacrifices, making Delos an ideal place to publish decrees of commendation. During the independence of Delos, there were 507 honorific decrees, including those that did not include the word ‘proxenos’ and those without any other related honour. Meanwhile some scholars have suggested that the number of decrees identified as undoubtedly Proxeny is 239. Delos itself was a small island with little habitable area and a small civic population, so most of the honours were bestowed on non-natives. Decrees honouring proxeny, mostly in the form of separate monuments, were more concentrated in date and appear later, beginning in the 4th century BC and ending in the 2nd century AD. Of these, the largest number of proxeny decrees were issued in the 2nd century BC. This prosperity may have reflected the growing commercial position of Delos under Athenian control, although some scholars attribute it to increased competition for influence among the Hellenistic kingdoms. There was also a regular pattern of decrees honouring proxeny issued by the Ecclesia and the Council of Delos:

ἔδοξεν τῆι βουλῆι καὶ τῶι δήμωι· Τηλέμνηστος Ἀριστείδου εἶπεν· ἐπειδὴ Μάαρκος Σέστιος Μαάρκου Φρεγελλανὸς ἀνὴρ ἀγαθὸς ὢν διατελεῖ περί τε [τὸ] ἱερὸν καὶ τὸν δῆμον τὸν Δηλίων καὶ χρείας παρέχετα[ι] καὶ κοινεῖ τῆι πόλει καὶ ἰδί[αι] τοῖς ἐντυγχάνουσιν αὐτ[ῶι] τῶν πολιτῶν εἰς ἃ ἄν τις [αὐ]τὸν παρακαλεῖ, τὴν πᾶσα[ν σπου]δὴν καὶ ἐπιμέλειαν ποιούμ[ε]νος· περὶ δὴ τούτων δεδόχ[θαι] τῆι βουλῆι καὶ τῶι δήμωι· ἐπαινέσαι Μάαρκον Σέστιον Μαάρκου Φρεγελλανὸν ἐπὶ τῆι α[ἱ]ρέσει ἧν ἔχων διατελεῖ περί τε τὸ ἱερὸν καὶ τὸν δῆμον τὸν Δηλίων καὶ εἶναι αὐτὸν πρ[ό]ξενον καὶ εὐεργέτην τοῦ τε ἱεροῦ καὶ Δηλίων καὶ αὐτὸν καὶ ἐγγόνους, εἶναι δὲ αὐτοῖς ἐν Δήλωι γῆς καὶ οἰκίας ἔνκτησιν [καὶ] πρόσοδον πρὸς τὴ[ν βουλὴν ․․․․].

Translation:

The council and the people decreed: Telemnestos, son of Aristeides, proposed that since Marcus Sestius, son of Marcus, of Fregellae, a man of excellence, continues to act with dedication toward both the sanctuary and the people of Delos, providing assistance both publicly for the city and privately to citizens who appeal to him for whatever needs, the council and the people have resolved: to commend Marcus Sestius, son of Marcus, of Fregellae, for the conduct he maintains toward the sanctuary and the people of Delos, and to appoint him and his descendants as proxenos and benefactor of both the sanctuary and the Delians. They shall also have the right to own land and houses on Delos and access to the council [...]

The decree explicitly states that the honoree is a proxenos of both the sanctuary and the Delians. The decree begins by stating that the enacting body is the Council and Ecclesia, followed by the proposer, the name and patronymic of the honoured person, the reason for the award, the title of the award, and sometimes concludes with a description of the details of the publication. The decree of Delos may not necessarily include a specific reason for the commendation, but only a general statement that he has been beneficial to the sanctuary and to the people of Delos. In general, the wording is rather fixed and formulaic, with expressions such as: ‘to the best of his ability to serve the people of Delos, who turn to him for help in public and private (χρειας παρεχόμενος καὶ κοινεῖ τεῖ πόλει καὶ ἰδίαι τοῖς ἐντιγχάνουσιν αὐτῶι Δηλίων)’.

Prior to 314 BC, the decrees of Delos were few and insufficient to summarise patterned expressions. Between 314 BC and about 230 BC, the enacting institution was expressed in two ways: ‘The people shall decide (δεδόχθαι τῶι δήμωι)’ and ’ The council and the people shall decide (δεδόχθαι τῆι βουλῆι καὶ τῶι δήμωι)’, but the subsequent decree, the enacting institution is essentially the same: ‘the council and the people decide’. The change in expression is not sufficient to prove a change in the procedure of decision, but may simply be a change in the habit of recording in the books. In Delos, an Ecclesia was held at least once a month, and ‘ἐκκλησία κυρία’ refers to the regular Ecclesia. After the resolution of commendation was passed by the council and Ecclesia, the decree was recorded in the council chamber and then published in the sanctuary. The decree was to be inscribed by the council in the council chamber and by the sacred officials on the stone stele of the temple, and sometimes the decree was subject to review.

In cases where the Delos’ decree of commendation did not confer a separate award, it was followed by a series of honours, such as exemption from all taxes, the right to acquire land and houses, citizenship, membership in a clan of one's own choosing, judicial precedence and immunity, preferential access to the council and the people after religious ceremonies, and preferential seating in competitions. In practice, many of the ordinances may have had recipients who did not live in Delos, but the rights were a safeguard for the honoured, and the immunities guaranteed protection from deprivation of property, especially important in the event of disputes between the home state and the honoured city-state. Some decrees would be written in more detail, such as ‘any property or goods that Herestratos acquires or imports into Delos or Hymnia shall be exempt from seizure by any creditor or those who have contracted with the city, unless a private agreement exists with Herestratos.’

Regarding the inscriptions with specific reasons for commendation, the reasons for commendation are quite varied. For example, in war, the four Rhodian commanders were responsible for the defence of the island and the security of Greece in the war; Epikrates of Rhodes commanded the decked warships, in conjunction with the islanders' triremes and Athenian undecked ships, to ensure the safety of navigation, the defence of the islands, and the uphold ritual obligations to the sanctuary; Semos of Rhodes protected the wives and daughters of the Delians in the wars. During the Hellenistic era, Delos maintained political and economic alliances with Hellenistic kingdoms, such as the Ptolemaic dynasty, evidenced by decrees honoring their officials, which was also reflected in the decree of commendation. They refer directly to the commendation of Sostratos of Knidos for his ‘steadfast goodwill and services to the Ptolemy I Soter and the islands’. Physicians, such as Archippos of Keos, were recognized for providing medical assistance to citizens during crises.

== See also ==
- Hospitium
- Xenia

== Bibliography ==
- Monceaux, P., Les Proxénies Grecques (Paris, 1885).
- Walbank, M., Athenian Proxenies of the Fifth Century B.C. (Toronto, 1978).
- Marek, C., Die Proxenie (Frankfurt am Main, 1984) (Europäische Hochschulschriften: Reihe 3, Geschichte und ihre Hilfswissenschaften, 213).
- Gerolymatos, A., Espionage and Treason: A Study of the Proxeny in Political and Military Intelligence Gathering in Classical Greece (Amsterdam, 1986).
- Knoepfler, D., Décrets Érétrians de Proxénie et de Citoyenneté (Lausanne, 2001) (Eretria Fouilles et Researches, 11).
- Gastaldi, Enrica Culasso, Le prossenie ateniesi del IV secolo a.C.: gli onorati asiatici (Alessandria: Edizioni dell'Orso, 2004) (Fonti e studi di storia antica, 10).
- Encyclopædia Britannica
