= 389 BC =

389 BC in various calendars
| Gregorian calendar | 389 BC; CCCLXXXIX BC |
| Ab urbe condita | 365 |
| Ancient Egypt era | XXIX dynasty, 10 |
| Pharaoh | Hakor, 5 |
| Ancient Greek Olympiad (summer) | 97th Olympiad, year 4 |
| Assyrian calendar | 4362 |
| Balinese saka calendar | N/A |
| Bengali calendar | −982 – −981 |
| Berber calendar | 562 |
| Buddhist calendar | 156 |
| Burmese calendar | −1026 |
| Byzantine calendar | 5120–5121 |
| Chinese calendar | 辛卯年 (Metal Rabbit); 2309 or 2102 — to — 壬辰年 (Water Dragon); 2310 or 2103 |
| Coptic calendar | −672 – −671 |
| Discordian calendar | 778 |
| Ethiopian calendar | −396 – −395 |
| Hebrew calendar | 3372–3373 |
- Hindu calendars
| Vikram Samvat | −332 – −331 |
| Shaka Samvat | N/A |
| Kali Yuga | 2712–2713 |
| Holocene calendar | 9612 |
| Iranian calendar | 1010 BP – 1009 BP |
| Islamic calendar | 1041 BH – 1040 BH |
| Javanese calendar | N/A |
| Julian calendar | N/A |
| Korean calendar | 1945 |
| Minguo calendar | 2300 before ROC 民前2300年 |
| Nanakshahi calendar | −1856 |
| Thai solar calendar | 154–155 |
| Tibetan calendar | 阴金兔年 (female Iron-Rabbit) −262 or −643 or −1415 — to — 阳水龙年 (male Water-Dragon) −261 or −642 or −1414 |

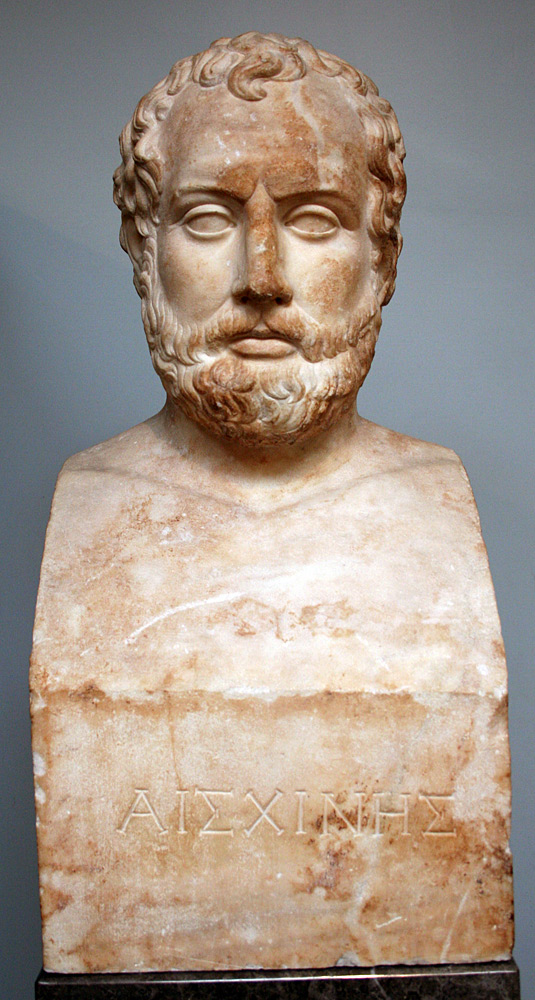
Marble bust of Aeschines (390–314 BC)

Year 389 BC was a year of the pre-Julian Roman calendar. At the time, it was known as the Year of the Tribunate of Poplicola, Capitolinus, Esquilinus, Mamercinus, Cornelius and Albinus (or, less frequently, year 365 Ab urbe condita). The denomination 389 BC for this year has been used since the early medieval period, when the Anno Domini calendar era became the prevalent method in Europe for naming years.

== Events ==
=== By place ===
==== Greece ====
- A Spartan expeditionary force under King Agesilaus II crosses the Gulf of Corinth to attack Acarnania, an ally of the anti-Spartan coalition. Agesilaus is eventually able to draw them into a pitched battle, in which the Acarnanians are routed.
- The Athenian general, Thrasybulus, leads a force of triremes to levy tribute from cities around the Aegean and support Rhodes, where a democratic government is struggling against Sparta. On this campaign, Thrasybulus captures Byzantium, imposes a duty on ships passing through the Hellespont, and collects tribute from many of the Aegean Islands.
- Due to threats of attack from Akarnania, Kalydon garrisons the Achaeans.
- The orator Isaeus gives his earliest known speech, the Dicaeogenes.

==== Magna Grecia ====
- Battle of the Elleporus and the capture of Kroton by Dionysius I of Syracuse

==== China ====
- Wu Qi, the prime minister of the State of Chu, enacts his first series of political, municipal, and martial reforms. Wu Qi gains the ire and distrust of Chu officials and aristocratic elite who are against his crusades to sweep up corruption in the state and limit their power. He is eventually assassinated in 381 BC at the funeral of King Diao of Chu, although his assassins are executed shortly after by the newly enthroned King Su of Chu.
- This is the latest possible date for the compilation of the historical text Zuo Zhuan, attributed to a blind historian known as Zuo Qiuming.

== Births ==
- Aeschines, Greek statesman and orator (d. 314 BC)
