= 240 BC =

240 BC in various calendars
- Gregorian calendar: 240 BC; CCXL BC
- Ab urbe condita: 514
- Ancient Egypt era: XXXIII dynasty, 84
- Pharaoh: Ptolemy III Euergetes, 7
- Ancient Greek Olympiad (summer): 135th Olympiad (victor)¹
- Assyrian calendar: 4511
- Balinese saka calendar: N/A
- Bengali calendar: −833 – −832
- Berber calendar: 711
- Buddhist calendar: 305
- Burmese calendar: −877
- Byzantine calendar: 5269–5270
- Chinese calendar: 庚申年 (Metal Monkey); 2458 or 2251 — to — 辛酉年 (Metal Rooster); 2459 or 2252
- Coptic calendar: −523 – −522
- Discordian calendar: 927
- Ethiopian calendar: −247 – −246
- Hebrew calendar: 3521–3522
- Hindu calendars
- Vikram Samvat: −183 – −182
- Shaka Samvat: N/A
- Kali Yuga: 2861–2862
- Holocene calendar: 9761
- Iranian calendar: 861 BP – 860 BP
- Islamic calendar: 887 BH – 886 BH
- Javanese calendar: N/A
- Julian calendar: N/A
- Korean calendar: 2094
- Minguo calendar: 2151 before ROC 民前2151年
- Nanakshahi calendar: −1707
- Seleucid era: 72/73 AG
- Thai solar calendar: 303–304
- Tibetan calendar: ལྕགས་ཕོ་སྤྲེ་ལོ་ (male Iron-Monkey) −113 or −494 or −1266 — to — ལྕགས་མོ་བྱ་ལོ་ (female Iron-Bird) −112 or −493 or −1265

Year 240 BC was a year of the pre-Julian Roman calendar. At the time it was known as the Year of the Consulship of Centho and Tuditanus (or, less frequently, year 514 Ab urbe condita). The denomination 240 BC for this year has been used since the early medieval period, when the Anno Domini calendar era became the prevalent method in Europe for naming years.

== Events ==
=== By place ===
==== Carthage ====
- Two of Carthage's mercenary commanders – Spendius and Mathos – convince the Libyan conscripts of the mercenary army occupying the Carthaginian city of Tunis to accept their leadership. They persuade the native Libyans that Carthage will take revenge against them for their part in the conflict once the foreign mercenaries are paid and sent home. They then convince the combined mercenary armies to revolt against Carthage and convince the various native Libyan towns and cities to back the revolt. Spendius and Mathos then take the Carthaginian commander Gesco as a hostage. What has started as an argument over pay owed to soldiers by the Carthaginian Government, explodes into a full-scale revolt, known as the Mercenary War.
- The Libyan forces loyal to the mercenaries besiege the towns of Utica and Hippacritae, which refuse to defect to the mercenaries.
- Hanno the Great is given command of the Carthaginian forces. However, the mercenaries defeat the Carthaginian armies in the Battle of Utica.
- Carthage decides to give Hamilcar Barca joint command with Hanno the Great. Hamilcar Barca is able to end the siege of Utica by the mercenaries. He is then placed in complete command of the Carthaginian forces and defeats the mercenaries in the Battle of the Bagradas River.
- After the Numidian mercenary leader Narawas defects to Hamilcar Barca, Numidian reinforcements (about 2,000 men) help him defeat the mercenaries again. Hamilcar pardons his captured prisoners, accepting into his army anyone who will fight for Carthage, and exiling anyone who will not.

==== Roman Republic ====
- Rome takes over full control of Sicily and stations a legion there.

==== China ====
- The Qin general Meng Ao takes the Zhao cities of Long, Hu and Qingdu but then dies en route to the Wei city of Ji. This is then captured by Meng Ao's son Meng Wu.

=== By topic ===
==== Literature ====
- The first Latin tragedy by Livius Andronicus, Achilles, is first produced.

==== Astronomy ====
- May 25 – Chinese astronomers make the first recorded observation of Halley's Comet.
- The Hellenistic period Mathematician Eratosthenes estimates the Earth's circumference to be 252,000 stadia, a figure between 2%-20% off modern measurements.

== Deaths ==
- Aratus, Greek poet from Soli in Cilicia, best remembered for his poem on astronomy Phaenomena (b. c. 315 BC)
- Aristomachos the Elder, Greek tyrant from Argos
- Asandhimitra, Mauryan empress and wife of Ashoka
- Callimachus, Greek poet and librarian
- Posidippus, Greek epigrammatic poet
- Zou Yan, Chinese philosopher (b. 305 BC)
- Meng Ao, Qin general
