= 376 BC =

376 BC in various calendars
Gregorian calendar	376 BC; CCCLXXVI BC
Ab urbe condita	378
Ancient Egypt era	XXX dynasty, 5
Pharaoh	Nectanebo I, 5
Ancient Greek Olympiad (summer)	101st Olympiad (victor)¹
Assyrian calendar	4375
Balinese saka calendar	N/A
Bengali calendar	−969 – −968
Berber calendar	575
Buddhist calendar	169
Burmese calendar	−1013
Byzantine calendar	5133–5134
Chinese calendar	甲辰年 (Wood Dragon); 2322 or 2115 — to — 乙巳年 (Wood Snake); 2323 or 2116
Coptic calendar	−659 – −658
Discordian calendar	791
Ethiopian calendar	−383 – −382
Hebrew calendar	3385–3386
- Hindu calendars
Vikram Samvat	−319 – −318
Shaka Samvat	N/A
Kali Yuga	2725–2726
Holocene calendar	9625
Iranian calendar	997 BP – 996 BP
Islamic calendar	1028 BH – 1027 BH
Javanese calendar	N/A
Julian calendar	N/A
Korean calendar	1958
Minguo calendar	2287 before ROC 民前2287年
Nanakshahi calendar	−1843
Thai solar calendar	167–168
Tibetan calendar	ཤིང་ཕོ་འབྲུག་ལོ་ (male Wood-Dragon) −249 or −630 or −1402 — to — ཤིང་མོ་སྦྲུལ་ལོ་ (female Wood-Snake) −248 or −629 or −1401

Year 376 BC was a year of the pre-Julian Roman calendar. At the time, it was known as the Year of the Tribunate of Mugillanus, Lanatus, Cornelius and Praetextatus (or, less frequently, year 378 Ab urbe condita). The denomination 376 BC for this year has been used since the early medieval period, when the Anno Domini calendar era became the prevalent method in Europe for naming years.

== Events ==
=== By place ===
==== Greece ====
- The Athenian admiral Chabrias wins a naval victory for Athens over the Spartan fleet, off the island of Naxos (the Battle of Naxos). The battle is brought on by the Athenians to break the Spartans' blockade of Athens' corn-ships from the Black Sea.
- The Thracian city of Abdera is sacked by the Triballi.

== Births ==
- Olympias, wife of king Philip II of Macedon and mother of Alexander the Great (d. 316 BC)

== Deaths ==
- Zhou An Wang, king of the Chinese Zhou dynasty
