= Aristodemus of Miletus =

4th century BC Greek general, diplomat and official

Aristodemus
- Born: Miletus (high probability) (modern-day Balat, Didim, Aydın, Turkey)
- Died: Miletus (high probability) (modern-day Balat, Didim, Aydın, Turkey)
- Occupations: Diplomat, general, politician
- Years active: Last two decades of the 4th century
- Opponents: Ptolemy; Cassander; Alexander

Aristodemus of Miletus (Greek: Ἀριστόδημος; lived 4th century BC) was one of the oldest and most trusted friends of Antigonus Monophthalmus. He is described by Plutarch as an arch-flatterer of Antigonus. Antigonus frequently used him on important diplomatic missions and occasionally entrusted him with military commands as well.

== Career ==
He is first mentioned in 319 BC when he brought Antigonus the news of Antipater's death.

=== Greece ===
In 314 BC, Antigonus sent him to the Peloponnese with 1,000 talents, ordered him to maintain friendly relations with Polyperchon and his son Alexander, to collect as large a body of mercenaries, and to conduct the war against Cassander. On his arrival in Laconia, he obtained permission from the Spartans to engage mercenaries in their country, and thus raised an army of 8,000 men in the Peloponnese. In this Aristodemus was outstandingly successful. The friendship with Polyperchon and his son Alexander was confirmed, and the former was made governor of the peninsula. The ruler of Ptolemaic Egypt, Ptolemy, who was allied with Cassander, sent a fleet against the general and the allies of Antigonus, and Cassander made considerable conquests in the Peloponnese. After his departure, Aristodemus and Alexander at first endeavoured in common to persuade the towns to expel the garrisons of Cassander, and recover their independence. But Alexander soon allowed himself to be made a traitor to the cause he had hitherto espoused, and was rewarded by Cassander with the chief command of his forces in the Peloponnese. In 313 BC, Aristodemus invited the Aetolians to support the cause of Antigonus; and having raised a great number of mercenaries from among them, he returned to the Pelopponese and attacked Alexander, who was besieging Cyllene, and compelled him to raise the siege. He then restored several other places, such as Patras and Dyme in Achaea, to what was then called freedom. In 312 BC, Aristodemus was reinforced by Antigonus's nephews Polemaeus and Telesphorus who both sailed their armies to the Peloponnese. Under the command of Polemaeus they brought all of Greece south of Thermopylae, except for Athens, into Antigonus's control. Cassander thereupon opened negotiations with Polemaeus; Artistodemus was one of the negotiators. He was also sent to negotiate with Ptolemy in Egypt. Through his negotiations he helped bring about the peace of 311 BC; the Peace of the Dynasts. In 307 BC, Aristodemus accompanied Demetrius on his great expedition to Greece to liberate Athens. After Demetrius captured Piraeus Aristodemus was sent into Athens to negotiate with Demetrius of Phaleron, Cassanders's ally and tyrant of Athens. As a result Cassander's forces withdrew from Athens, and Demetrius was able to proclaim the restoration of Athenian Democracy.

=== Back in Asia ===
When Antigonus commanded Demetrius to sail against Ptolemy's forces in Cyprus, Aristodemus accompanied him there. He was present during the great naval battle near Cyprian Salamis, where Demetrius annihilated Ptolemy's fleet and captured the island. Aristodemus was chosen to bring the news of the victory to Antigonus at his new city of Antigoneia-on-the-Orontes in Syria. There he was instrumental in an elaborate charade to have Antigonus elevated to kingship. Aristodemus landed from his ship alone and refused to give any indication of the news he bore, he advanced slowly to the royal palace, gathering a large crowd. Meeting the by now worried Antigonus at the palace gate, he cried aloud, "Hail, King Antigonus!" and described the great victory won. Enthused the assembled crowd proclaimed Antigonus king.

=== Return to Miletus ===
After his great moment in Antigoneia Aristodemus went back to Miletus where he entered high office.
