= 270 BC =

270 BC in various calendars
Gregorian calendar	270 BC; CCLXX BC
Ab urbe condita	484
Ancient Egypt era	XXXIII dynasty, 54
Pharaoh	Ptolemy II Philadelphus, 14
Ancient Greek Olympiad (summer)	127th Olympiad, year 3
Assyrian calendar	4481
Balinese saka calendar	N/A
Bengali calendar	−863 – −862
Berber calendar	681
Buddhist calendar	275
Burmese calendar	−907
Byzantine calendar	5239–5240
Chinese calendar	庚寅年 (Metal Tiger); 2428 or 2221 — to — 辛卯年 (Metal Rabbit); 2429 or 2222
Coptic calendar	−553 – −552
Discordian calendar	897
Ethiopian calendar	−277 – −276
Hebrew calendar	3491–3492
- Hindu calendars
Vikram Samvat	−213 – −212
Shaka Samvat	N/A
Kali Yuga	2831–2832
Holocene calendar	9731
Iranian calendar	891 BP – 890 BP
Islamic calendar	918 BH – 917 BH
Javanese calendar	N/A
Julian calendar	N/A
Korean calendar	2064
Minguo calendar	2181 before ROC 民前2181年
Nanakshahi calendar	−1737
Seleucid era	42/43 AG
Thai solar calendar	273–274
Tibetan calendar	ལྕགས་ཕོ་སྟག་ལོ་ (male Iron-Tiger) −143 or −524 or −1296 — to — ལྕགས་མོ་ཡོས་ལོ་ (female Iron-Hare) −142 or −523 or −1295

Year 270 BC was a year of the pre-Julian Roman calendar. At the time it was known as the Year of the Consulship of Clepsina and Blasio (or, less frequently, year 484 Ab urbe condita). The denomination 270 BC for this year has been used since the early medieval period, when the Anno Domini calendar era became the prevalent method in Europe for naming years.

== Events ==
=== By place ===
==== Roman Republic ====
- Rome's subjugation of Italy is completed by the recapture of Rhegium (southern Italy) from the Mamertines and the defeat of the Brutians, the Lucanians, the Calabrians and the Samnites. The town of Rhegium is then restored by the Romans to its Greek inhabitants.

==== Carthage ====
- Carthage, already in control of Sardinia, southern Spain and Numidia, is ruled by an oligarchy of merchants under two Suffetes or chief magistrates. While Carthage's military commanders are strong, the state relies on mercenaries (including Spanish ones) for its soldiers.

== Births ==
- Hamilcar Barca, founder of Barcid Spain and leading Carthaginian general who will fight against Rome in Sicily and Italy, against the Libyans and the mercenary revolt in Africa, and against the Iberians and Celti-Iberians in Spain (d. 228 BC)
- Gnaeus Naevius, was a Roman epic poet and dramatist of the Old Latin period. (d. 201 BC)

== Deaths ==
- Arsinoe II, queen to Lysimachus, the king of Thrace, and later wife of her brother, King Ptolemy II Philadelphus of Egypt (b. c. 316 BC)
- Epicurus, Greek philosopher, author of an ethical philosophy of simple pleasure, friendship, and retirement (b. 341 BC)
- Marcus Valerius Corvus, Roman hero (b. c. 370 BC)
- Manius Curius Dentatus, Roman general, conqueror of the Samnites and victor against Pyrrhus, King of Epirus
- Pyrrho, Greek philosopher from Elis, credited as being the first skeptic philosopher and inspiration for the school known as Pyrrhonism (b. c. 360 BC)
- Euclid of Alexandria, Mathematician, considered the "father of geometry", chiefly known for the Elements treatise, which established the foundations of geometry, has been estimated to die in 270 BC
