= Philip (son of Antipater) =

Macedonian general, brother of Cassander

Philip (Greek: Φίλιππoς; lived from 4th century to 3rd century) was son of Antipater, the regent of Macedonia, and brother of Cassander, by whom he was sent in 319 with an army to invade Aetolia. But on his arrival in Acarnania the news that Aeacides, king of Epirus, had recovered possession of his throne, induced him to turn his arms against that monarch, whom he defeated in a pitched battle. Aeacides with the remnant of his forces having afterwards joined the Aetolians, a second action ensued, in which Philip was again victorious, and Aeacides himself fell in the battle. The Aetolians hereupon abandoned the open country, and took refuge in their mountain fastnesses. According to Justin Philip had participated with his two brothers, Cassander and Iollas, in the conspiracy for the murder of Alexander the Great in 323 BC. He was the father of Antipater Etesias.
