= Lyciscus of Macedon =

General of Cassander

Lykiskos (Ancient Greek: Λυκίσκος), (English: Lycisus), was an officer of the Macedonian Cassander in the 4th century BCE.

Lyciscus was sent by Cassander to Epirus as regent and general, when the Epirotes had passed sentence of banishment against their king Aeacides and allied themselves with Cassander in 316 BCE.

In 314 BCE, Cassander left him in command of a strong body of troops in Acarnania, which he had organized against the Aetolians, who favored the cause of Antigonus Monophthalmus. Lyciscus was still commanding in Acarnania in 312 BCE, when he was sent with an army into Epirus against Alcetas whom he defeated. He also took the town of Eurymnae, and destroyed it.
