= Telesphorus (general) =

4th-century BCE Macedonian general, Antigonid, nephew of Antigonus I Monophthalmus

Telesphorus (in Greek Tελεσφόρoς; lived 4th century BC) was a nephew and a general in the service of Antigonus Monophthalmus (founder of the Antigonid dynasty), the ruler and later king of the Asian half of the empire conquered by Alexander the Great, who was sent by him in 312 BC, with a fleet of fifty ships and a considerable army to the Peloponnese, to oppose the forces of Polyperchon and Cassander. At first he was very successful; he drove Polyperchon’s garrisons from all the cities of the peninsula, except Sicyon and Corinth, which were held by Polyperchon himself; but having joined with Antigonid admiral Medius in an attempt to relieve Oreus on Euboea, to which Cassander had laid siege, he was beaten back, with the loss of several ships. The following summer (311 BC), Antigonus having conferred the chief direction of the war in the Peloponnese upon his other nephew Ptolemy, Telesphorus was so indignant that he shook off his allegiance, and having induced some of his soldiers to follow him, established himself in Elis on his own account, and even plundered the sacred treasures at Olympia. He was, however, soon after, induced by Ptolemy to submit. Antigonus must have forgiven him because a few years later Telesphorus was on the staff of Demetrius, Antigonus’ son.

== Sources ==
=== Ancient Sources ===
- Diodorus Siculus, Bibliotheca Historica, book XIX.
- Diogenes Laertios, book V.

=== Modern Sources ===
- Billows, Richard A. (1990). Antigonos the One-Eyed and the Creation of the Hellenistic State. Berkeley and Los Angeles, California: University of California Press. ISBN 0-520-20880-3.
- Smith, William (editor); Dictionary of Greek and Roman Biography and Mythology, "Telesphorus", Boston, (1867)
