= Battle of Lautulae =

Battle in 315 BC during the Second Samnite War

- Part of the Samnite Wars
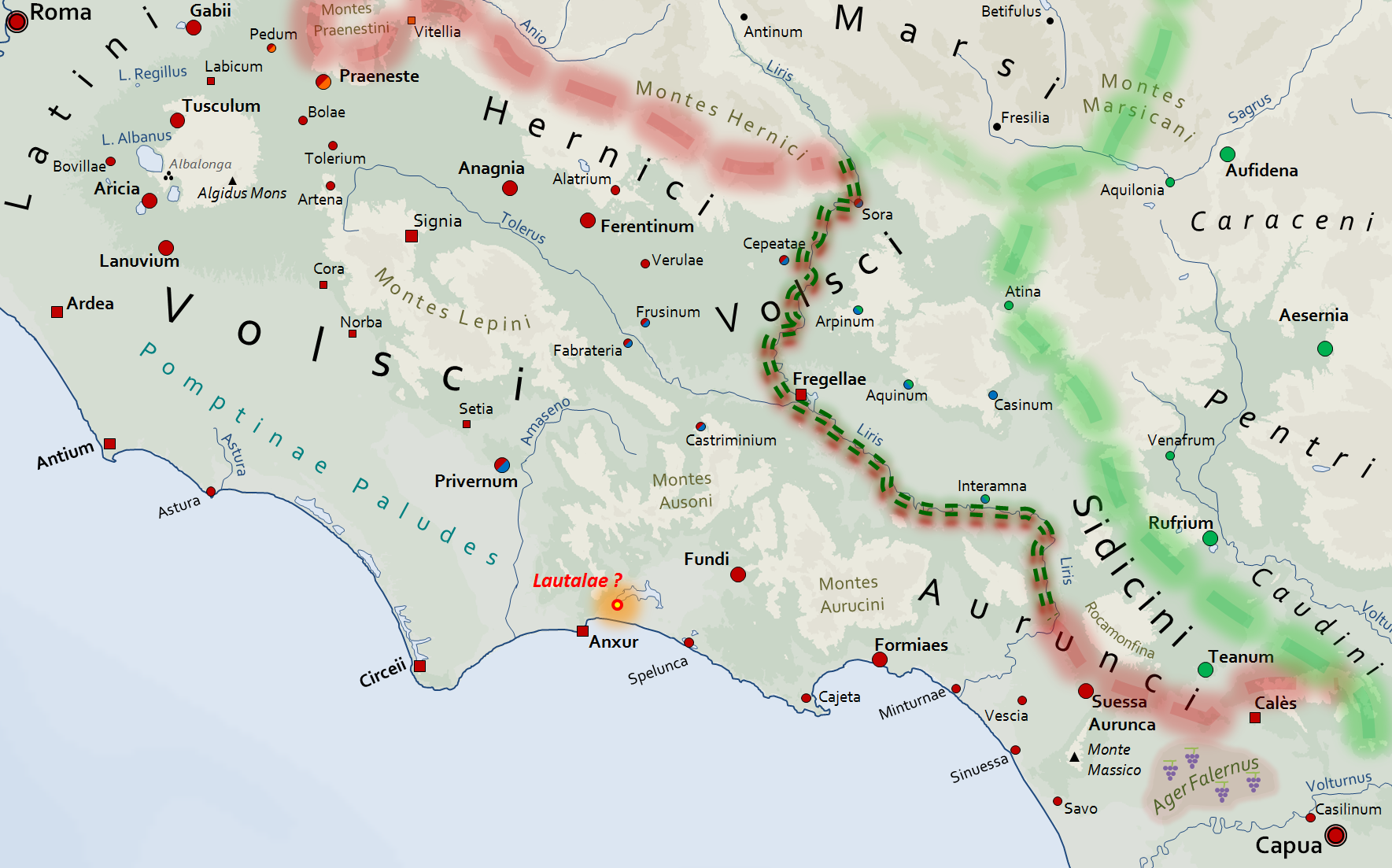
- Map of Lazio with possible location of Lautalae.
Date	315 BC
Location	near Terracina, Italy
Result	Samnite victory

Belligerents
Roman Republic	Samnium

Commanders and leaders
Fabius Maximus Rullianus	

Strength
7800	9000

Casualties and losses
1700	1500

The Battle of Lautulae was fought in 315 BC during the Second Samnite War, opposing the Roman Republic (led by dictator Quintus Fabius Maximus Rullianus) and the Samnites, who defeated the Romans.

== Background ==
In 315 BC, the Romans elected Lucius Papirius Cursor and Quintus Publilius Philo as consuls. These were the same consuls who were elected five years earlier to deal with the crisis that followed Rome's defeat at the Caudine Forks against the Samnites. This same year, Cursor went to Apulia to attack the Samnites at Luceria, while Philo went to Campania to attack the Samnites at Saticula. Simultaneously, another Roman force, under Quintus Fabius Maximus Rullianus, continued to press an attack on Satricum and on the Volscian rebels in the Liris valley. This was a logical progression of the policy of southward expansion; however later it was revealed, this was a dangerous dispersal of Rome's military strength.

In Apulia, Cursor laid siege to Samnite-controlled Luceria, and in the Liris valley Fabius Maximus recovered Satricum. Reports from Campagnia told that a Samnite force either defeated or eluded Philo and began to move toward Latium. Fabius Maximus was the only commander close enough who could help defend Latium. He chose to cover the inland route while the Samnites came steadily on. When the Samnites reached the site of Fregellae, they were faced with the choice of either continuing onto Rome along the Trerus valley or travelling left, thereby splitting the Roman territory. They chose the latter course and this brought them against the forces of Quintus Aulius Cerretanus at Lautulae.

== Battle ==
The inexperienced Roman levies were no match for the hardy Samnites and were soundly defeated. The only Roman who chose not to flee was Quintus Aulius Cerretanus, who stayed to fight the Samnites and was killed. The Roman territory had been split. The southern portion of Rome was inhabited by citizens who were persuaded or coerced by the Samnites to renounce the allegiance to Rome. The northern half of Rome was inhabited by citizens with full rights. However they were being advanced upon by the Samnites.

In the meantime, in Rome, Rullianus and the authorities were trying to protect the various approaches in the city. They succeeded in doing so, but it weakened the Roman forces in the Liris Valley. There the Samnites stormed across the river and captured Sora. Then, the Samnites thwarted lines of communication between Roman forces within the city and those in Apulia. This is where the Samnite success had reached its peak.

== Aftermath ==
This new defeat, which followed that at the Caudine Forks, forced the Roman military to reorganize and rethink their strategy. The Romans had a knack for learning from their enemies, such as the Greeks, Etruscans, and Carthaginians. For example, they learned how to fight with round shields from the Etruscans, and they learned how to manipulate siege craft from the Greeks. What they learned from the Samnites was how to fight in maniples, and they later turned this against the Samnites and defeated them.

== Analysis ==
There are two versions of the battle. Livy wrote the main narrative of the Battle of Lautulae, quite favorable to Rome. He recounts that the battle was indecisive and had to be broken off because of the coming of the night. However, Livy mentions an alternative account where the Romans were defeated and the master of the horse was killed. However, the aftermath of the battle clearly shows that the Samnites inflicted a major defeat upon the Romans. This was shown through the widespread civil unrest and revolts among Rome's Volscian, Auruncan, and Campanian allies.
