= Cratesipolis =

Cratesipolis Kρατησίπoλις

Ruler of Sicyon and Corinth
- Reign: 314-308 BCE
- Spouse: Alexander (son of Polyperchon)

Cratesipolis (Greek: Kρατησίπoλις meaning "conqueror of the city") was the ruler of Sicyon and Corinth in 314-308 BC. She was the wife of Alexander (son of Polyperchon) and was highly distinguished for her beauty, talents, and energy. Her name may have been a nickname earned through her conquest of Sicyon.

In 314 BC when her husband was assassinated at Sicyon, she assumed command of his forces, with whom her kindness had made her extremely popular. When the Sicyonians, hoping for an easy conquest over a woman, attacked the garrison to attempt to establishing an independent government, she quelled the sedition and crucified thirty of the rebels. Her victory held the town firmly in subjection under Cassander.

However in 308 BC she was induced by Ptolemy, the ruler of Ptolemaic Egypt, to surrender Corinth and Sicyon. When Ptolemy took control of Corinth and Sicyon, Cassander's only remaining city in Greece was Athens. Cratesipolis was at Corinth at the time and she knew that her troops would never consent to the surrender, so she sent some of Ptolemy's forces into the town instead, pretending that they were a reinforcement that she ordered from Sicyon. She then withdrew with her troops to Patras in Achaea, where she was living.

In 307 BC she had met with Demetrius Poliorcetes with whom she had a mutual admiration. Prior to this casual meeting, Demetrius pitched a tent near the city of Patras so that Cratesipolis could arrive unseen. Anti-Antigonid forces, however, were aware of Demetrius’ presence in the area and attacked, forcing Demetrius to flee the area. This the last mention of Cratesipolis in any source.
