= Ptolemy (nephew of Antigonus I Monophthalmus) =

4th-century BCE Macedonian general, Antigonid dynasty, nephew of Antigonus Monophthalmus

Ptolemaeus (Ancient Greek: Πτολεμαῖος, romanized: Ptolemaios) or Ptolemy (died 309 BC) was a nephew and general of Antigonus I Monophthalmus, one of the Successors of Alexander the Great. His father was also called Ptolemy and was a brother of Antigonus. Ptolemy, the nephew, was Antigonus's right-hand-man until his son Demetrius took on a more prominent role.

He is first mentioned as being present with his uncle at the siege of Nora in 319 BC, when he was given up to Eumenes as a hostage for the safety of the latter during a conference with Antigonus. A few years later we find him entrusted by his uncle with commands of importance. In 315 BC, when Antigonus moved against the coalition of Diadochi formed against him, he placed Ptolemy at the head of an army which marched against the generals of Cassander in Asia Minor.

The young general successfully carried out his mission, relieving Amisus, which was besieged by Asclepiodorus, and recovered the whole satrapy of Cappadocia; after which he advanced into Bithynia, compelling king Zipoites to join Antigonus. Upon his approach and occupation of Ionia, Seleucus withdrew from that territory. He made an alliance with Dionysius the tyrant of Heraclea, cemented by marrying the tyrant's daughter.

In the latter part of that year, Ptolemy next threatened Caria, which was defended for a time by Myrmidon of Athens, a mercenary in service to Ptolemaic Egypt. In the following year (313 BC) Ptolemy was able to strike a decisive blow in that quarter against Eupolemus, a general of Cassander, whom he surprised and defeated; Ptolemy had been attending his father's funeral when his opponent Asander (satrap of Karia) received reinforcements from his ally Cassander and decided to strike at Ptolemy's troops who were without their commander and scattered around Karia in winter quarters. He sent Eupolemus with 8,000 foot and 200 horse to take Ptolemy's forces by surprise. Ptolemy somehow got word of the surprise attack and ambushed Eupolemus, capturing his entire force.

In the summer of 313 BC, Antigonus and his main army marched into Asia Minor, while his admiral Medius sailed with his fleet from Phoenicia. On route Medius's fleet intercepted one of Cassander's fleets capturing all of its ships. Antigonus and Asander came to an agreement whereby Asander became a subordinate of Antigonus. Cassander's generals Prepelaus and Eupolemus were allowed to retreat from Asia Minor. Some time later Asander rebelled, forcing Antigonus to invade Caria. Calling all his forces from their winter quarters, he divided them into four columns: the first was sent to take Miletus; the second under Ptolemy through central Caria from east to west; a third to take Theangela; and Antigonus himself with the main army campaigned from north to south capturing Tralles, Iasus and Kaunos. Caria was taken in the space of weeks. Antigonus sent his nephew Telesphoros with an army to mainland Greece to carry on the war there against Cassander. The next year Ptolemy was sent with a considerable army and fleet to take over from Telesphoros; Antigonus made him commander in chief of all his forces and affairs in Greece.

His successes were at first rapid: he drove out the garrisons of his adversary from Chalcis and Oropus, invaded Attica, where he compelled Athens's tyrant Demetrius Phalereus to make overtures of submission, and then carried his arms triumphantly through Boeotia, Phocis, and Locris. Wherever he went, he expelled Cassander's garrisons, and proclaimed the liberty and independence of the cities.

He then directed his armies to the Peloponnese, where the authority of Antigonus had been endangered by the recent defection of his general Telesphorus another nephew of Antigonus's. Ptolemy succeeded in bringing Telesphorus back into the fold. Here he appears to have remained till the peace of 311 suspended hostilities in that region.

He is thought to have considered that his services had not met with their due reward from Antigonus; and therefore, when in 310 BC Cassander and Ptolemy were preparing to renew the war, Ptolemy suddenly abandoned the cause of his uncle and concluded a treaty with Cassander and Ptolemy. His ambition may have been to establish himself in chief command in the Peloponnese: but the reconciliation of Polyperchon with Cassander must have frustrated this: and on the arrival of Ptolemy with a fleet at Cos, Ptolemy repaired from Chalcis to join him. He was received at first with the utmost favour, but soon gave offence to his new patron by his intrigues and ambitious demonstrations, and was in consequence thrown into prison and compelled to commit suicide by poison in 309 BC.
