= Alexander (son of Polyperchon) =

4th-century BC Macedonian general

Alexander (Greek: Αλέξανδρος; killed 314 BC) was a son of Polyperchon, the regent of Macedonia, and an important general in the Wars of the Diadochi.

== Alexander in Athens ==
Antipater, on his death in 319 BC, had left the regency to Polyperchon, to the exclusion and consequent discontent of his own son, Cassander. Those who had been placed in authority by Antipater in the garrisoned towns of Greece, were favourably disposed to Cassander, as their patron's son, and Polyperchon's policy, therefore, was to reverse the measures of Antipater, and restore democracy where Antipater had abolished it. To implement this plan Polyperchon's son, Alexander, was sent to Athens during 318, with the aim of delivering the city from Nicanor, who had been appointed by Cassander to command the garrison placed on Munychia (a hill in the port city of Piraeus, Athens' harbour) by Antipater.

Before Alexander's arrival, Nicanor strengthening his position on Munychia with fresh troops and had also treacherously seized Piraeus. Alexander had the same intentions, intentions which he had probably formed before he had any communication with Phocion, though Diodorus seems to imply the contrary. The Athenians, however, looked on Phocion as the author of the design, and their suspicions and anger were further excited by the private conferences between Alexander and Nicanor. As a result, Phocion was accused of treason, and, fleeing with several of his friends to Alexander, was despatched by Alexander to Polyperchon.

Cassander arrived in Athens soon after and occupied Piraeus. There he was besieged by Polyperchon with a large force. However, Polyperchon's forces lacked adequate supplies, so he was obliged to withdraw a portion of his army. Polyperchon used this army to attempt the reduction of Megalopolis, while Alexander was left in command of the remaining forces in Athens. However, it appears he achieved little, until the treaty and capitulation of Athens to Cassander.

== Alexander in the Peloponnese ==
When Polyperchon, baffled at Megalopolis, withdrew into Macedonia, his son seems to have been left with an army in the Peloponnese, where, according to Diodorus the field was left open to him. The friends of oligarchy were greatly alarmed by the departure of Cassander to Macedonia following the murder of Philip Arrhidaeus and Eurydice by Olympias during 317 BC. During Cassander's absence, Alexander captured several cities and important places in the Peloponnese. However, on Cassander's return to the south, after defeating Olympias in Macedonia, Alexander attempted in vain to check Cassander by fortifying the Isthmus of Corinth. Instead Cassander, crossed over to Epidaurus by sea, regained Argos and Hermione, and afterwards also the Messenian towns, with the exception of Ithome.

== Alliances with Antigonus and then Cassander ==
In 315 BC, Antigonus, whose growing power had led Cassander, Lysimachus, Asander, and Ptolemy to form a coalition against him, sent Aristodemus into the Peloponnese to secure an alliance with Polyperchon and his son Alexander. Alexander traveled to Asia to meet Antigonus in person, where an agreement was made at Tyre. Antigonus provided Alexander with 500 talents and promised significant support. However, later that same year, Alexander broke with Antigonus and aligned himself with Cassander, who offered him the title of strategos (military governor) of the Peloponnese.

Although Cassander had previously been at war with Polyperchon, the appointment of Alexander was part of a formal agreement that placed all of Cassander's Peloponnesian holdings under Alexander's command, including cities previously held by Cassander's garrisons. This allowed Alexander to exercise authority across nearly the entire peninsula. Polyperchon, now advanced in age, had likely stepped aside due to his unwillingness to subordinate himself to the much younger Cassander and had handed command to his son.

== Alexander's death ==
In the ensuing year, 314 BC, Alexander besieged Cyllene on behalf of Cassander and took punitive action against Dyme, which had defected to Antigonus. In 313 BC, after winning the allegiance of the Aetolian League, Aristodemus of Miletus (Antigonus' general and top diplomat in mainland Greece) crossed over into the Peloponnese at the head of a mercenary army, and raised the siege. After liberating Patrae and Aegium from Cassander's garrisons, Aristodemus returned to Aetolia, leaving a sizeable force in the Pelopponese. Aristodemus' troops in Aegium helped the city of Dyme eject its garrison. Alexander decided to intervene, he marched on the city and forced his way in, made himself master of it, punishing the inhabitants who had imposed him with death, imprisonment, or exile. Soon after this he was murdered at Sicyon by Alexion, a Sicyonian, leaving the command of his forces to his wife Cratesipolis who proved herself fully adequate to the task.
