= Polyperchon =

Macedonian general (4th c. BC)

Polyperchon (sometimes written Polysperchon; Greek: Πολυπέρχων; b. between 390–380 BC – d. after 304 BC, possibly into 3rd century BC), was a Macedonian Greek general who served both Philip II and Alexander the Great and then played an active role in the ensuing battles for control between Alexander's generals.

== Early career ==
Polyperchon was born between 390 and 380 BC. His father, Simmias, belonged to the local aristocracy from Tymphaia in Upper Macedonia, which was located in the valley of the Aliakmon River on the border with Thessaly and was a descendant of the royal dynasty of the local kings. Polyperchon also had a brother, Andromenes, whose sons: Amyntas, Simmias, Attalus, and Polemon became commanders in the army of Alexander the Great. Claudius Aelian reports a rumor that in his youth Polyperchon was a bandit. However, this fragment is found among twenty others, which in most cases are unreliable claims about the origins and early years of well-known figures of antiquity.

He served under Philip II and Alexander the Great, accompanying Alexander throughout his long journeys. After the Battle of Issus in 333 BC, Polyperchon was appointed commander of the battalion (taxis) of the Macedonian phalanx, replacing Ptolemy, who had fallen in battle. He continued to lead this unit throughout Alexander’s campaigns, including the Battle of Gaugamela in 331 BC, where he was positioned in the center between the taxeis of Meleager and Amyntas.

In 331/330, Polyperchon participated in the crossing of the Araxes River alongside Amyntas, Coenus, and the cavalry of Philotas, while Alexander advanced against Ariobarzanes. In 328, he was left in Bactria to help prevent rebellion in the region. Quintus Curtius Rufus records an incident from 327 in which Polyperchon mocked a Persian who performed proskynesis, a ceremonial act of bowing and kissing the foot, which angered Alexander and led to Polyperchon being thrown from his couch; however, modern scholars reject the account as apocryphal, and Polyperchon likely was not present at court at the time.

Early in the Indian campaign, he was left in Andaca with Craterus to subdue resistant provinces and destroy rebellious cities. He later rejoined the main army in Arigaeum and took part in the campaigns against the Massagetae and the Assacenians. At the Battle of the Hydaspes in 326 BC, Polyperchon was left behind with Alcetas and Craterus to guard the base camp and was instructed not to cross the river until Porus had been defeated or abandoned the opposite bank.

In August 324 BC, Alexander the Great ordered Craterus to lead a contingent of 10,000 veterans back to Macedon. Craterus was to replace Antipater as regent of the Macedonian kingdom in Europe, while Antipater was instructed to bring fresh troops to join Alexander in the East. Polyperchon was appointed as Craterus’s deputy, a decision that, according to Arrian, was due to Craterus’s declining health. Should anything happen to Craterus, Polyperchon was designated to assume his responsibilities. Their journey progressed slowly, and by the time of Alexander’s death in June 323 BC, both Craterus and Polyperchon were still in Cilicia.

== First War of the Diadochi ==
The death of Alexander the Great in 323 BC upended the plans of Craterus and the Macedonian high command. A major Greek uprising, later known as the Lamian War, broke out almost immediately. Antipater, left in charge in Macedon, suffered a defeat at the Battle of Thermopylae and was besieged in the city of Lamia. He urgently appealed for reinforcements from Craterus, then still in Cilicia, and from Leonnatus, satrap of Hellespontine Phrygia.

Craterus eventually marched west with a force of 10,000 infantry, 1,000 Persian archers and slingers, and 1,500 cavalry. His arrival proved decisive and shifted the balance of the war. Although Craterus held senior rank, he voluntarily deferred command to Antipater during the campaign. Following the end of the Lamian War, the two commanders launched a new expedition against the Aetolian League. Despite initial successes, the campaign was abruptly abandoned when news arrived that Perdiccas, the imperial regent in Asia, had declared war on Antipater. In response, a Macedonian war council agreed to make peace with the Aetolians in order to turn their focus eastward.

During this period, Polyperchon remained in Macedon, acting as governor in the absence of Antipater and Craterus. When the two senior commanders crossed into Asia to confront Perdiccas’s forces, Polyperchon was formally entrusted with authority over Greece and Macedon.

Meanwhile, the Aetolians, now allied with Perdiccas, launched another incursion into Thessaly, hoping to draw Antipater back from his campaign in Asia. Their general, Alexander of Aetolia, captured several cities, besieged the key town of Amphissa in Locris, and routed a Macedonian force under Polycles. Reinforced by local Thessalian allies, his army grew significantly in strength. However, a counter-invasion of Aetolia by Acarnanian forces forced the Aetolians to withdraw. They left behind a rearguard under Menon of Pharsalus to hold their gains in Thessaly. Soon after, Polyperchon entered Thessaly with a large army and crushed Menon’s force in battle. Menon was killed during the fighting, marking a major Macedonian victory.

The First War of the Diadochi ended in 321 BC with the death of Perdiccas and the triumph of Antipater, who was confirmed as regent at the Partition of Triparadisus. Polyperchon remained at Antipater’s side for the next several years.

== Regent ==
In 319 BC, shortly before his death, the aging Antipater appointed Polyperchon as regent of the Macedonian Empire and named his own son Cassander chiliarch (chief of staff), making him second in command. The decision came as a shock to Cassander, who had expected to be named his father's successor. Although Antipater had entrusted him with important responsibilities during his lifetime, including representing him at the court of Alexander and commanding forces in the Greek mainland, he was passed over in favor of the more experienced and senior Polyperchon.

The appointment immediately provoked tension between the two men. Cassander refused to accept the arrangement and began rallying political and military support. Many within the Macedonian aristocracy, as well as powerful satraps in the eastern provinces, saw Cassander as a more favorable figure, both due to his lineage and due to suspicion of Polyperchon’s intentions to restore traditional monarchical authority. Within months, open hostility broke out between the rival camps, marking the beginning of a new phase in the Wars of the Diadochi. Polyperchon aligned himself with Eumenes against Cassander, Antigonus and Ptolemy.

Although Polyperchon was initially successful in securing control of the Greek cities, whose freedom he proclaimed, he suffered a major setback at Megalopolis in 317 BC. A few months later, his fleet was destroyed by Antigonus, and Cassander seized control of Athens in 316. Shortly thereafter, Polyperchon was driven from Macedon by Cassander, who took control of the disabled King Philip Arrhidaeus and his wife Eurydice.

Polyperchon fled to Epirus, where he joined Alexander's mother Olympias, widow Roxana, and infant son Alexander IV. He formed an alliance with Olympias and King Aeacides of Epirus, and Olympias led an army into Macedon. She was initially successful, defeating and capturing the army of King Philip, whom she had murdered, but soon Cassander returned from the Peloponnesus and captured and murdered her in 316, taking Roxana and the boy king into his custody.

== Regency in exile ==
After his defeat in the north, Polyperchon withdrew to the Peloponnesus, where he retained control over several strongholds, including Corinth and Sicyon. There, he formed an alliance with Antigonus, who had by then broken with his former allies. Polyperchon surrendered the regency to Antigonus and was entrusted with command in southern Greece. By 314 BC, his son Alexander had been appointed strategos (military governor) of the Peloponnese by Cassander as part of a formal agreement, that placed all of Cassander’s Peloponnesian holdings under Alexander’s command, including cities previously held by Cassander’s garrisons. This allowed Alexander to exercise authority across nearly the entire peninsula. Polyperchon, now advanced in age, had likely stepped aside due to his unwillingness to subordinate himself to the much younger Cassander and had handed command to his son.

However, Alexander’s assassination at Sicyon by a local named Alexion destabilized the arrangement. Cassander excluded Polyperchon from the peace settlement with Antigonus in 311 BC (as recorded in Antigonus’s letter to the people of Scepsis). When war again broke out between Antigonus and the others, Antigonus sent Heracles, the reputed illegitimate son of Alexander the Great by Barsine, to Polyperchon as a bargaining chip to use against Cassander. Polyperchon retaliated against Cassander by promoting Heracles as the rightful heir to the throne.

== Reconciliation with Cassander ==
Although Polyperchon initially supported Heracles as a challenger to Cassander’s rule, he soon changed course. Likely recognizing the diminishing prospects of restoring the Argead dynasty through Heracles and seeking to preserve his own power and holdings, Polyperchon murdered the boy in 309 BC. This act paved the way for a political settlement with Cassander, removing the primary obstacle that had prevented reconciliation between the two men.

As part of the new agreement, Cassander agreed to formally recognize Polyperchon not only as strategos of the Peloponnese but also as a co-ruler with equal authority. The treaty also restored to Polyperchon his Macedonian estates, which had likely been granted to him in an earlier settlement but forfeited after his rebellion. This recognition effectively marked the end of Polyperchon’s decades-long struggle for control in the post-Alexandrian world.

== Later life ==
In the spring of 308 BC, Ptolemy arrived in Greece and began to seize cities in the Peloponnese. In his absence, Polyperchon’s daughter-in-law, Cratesipolis, widow of his son Alexander, was commanding in the region, but she judged her position untenable and surrendered her fortresses. This left Polyperchon without any territorial base. However, a new agreement between Cassander and Ptolemy allowed Polyperchon an opportunity to re-enter the Peloponnese. According to Plutarch, he may have already regained control of the area around Patrae by the summer of 307 BC. Over the following years, Polyperchon managed to reconquer much of the Peloponnese.

Beloch asserts that by 304 BC, Polyperchon held sway over nearly the entire peninsula, with the exceptions of Corinth, Sicyon, and Sparta. Diodorus Siculus explicitly mentions several cities under his control at this time, including Bura and Skyros in Achaea, and Orchomenos in Arcadia. The loyalty of Argos and the cities of the Argolid, namely Epidaurus, Troezen, and Hermione, is uncertain, but Beloch interpreted Plutarch’s phrasing as evidence that at least a significant portion of these cities had come under Polyperchon’s control during this period. He further argued that the pattern of reconquests between 307 and 304 BC indicates a deliberate and largely successful campaign to re-establish Polyperchon's authority across the Peloponnese.

However, this resurgence proved to be short-lived. In 303 BC, Demetrius Poliorcetes launched a campaign in Greece and quickly reversed many of Polyperchon’s gains. He captured Argos, Achaea, Elis, and most of Arcadia, leaving Polyperchon in control only of a few remaining cities, including Messenia and Mantineia. After this point, he disappears from the historical record, but the lack of further reference is only because Diodorus Siculus's subsequent narrative is lost and no others cover this period in sufficient detail. A mention in Plutarch's Life of Pyrrhus 8.3 suggests that Polyperchon might have lived into the early 3rd century BC. It is possible that Demetrius’ campaign against Messene in the year 295 was also directed against him.

Diodorus had previously referred to Polyperchon as “almost the oldest among Alexander’s companions-in-arms” in 319 BC, suggesting he was already elderly at the time of his appointment as regent. Polyperchon was likely in his eighties by 303 BC.

== Notes ==
Preceded by Antipater	Regent of Macedon; 319–317 BC	Succeeded by Cassander
