= 320s BC =

Decade

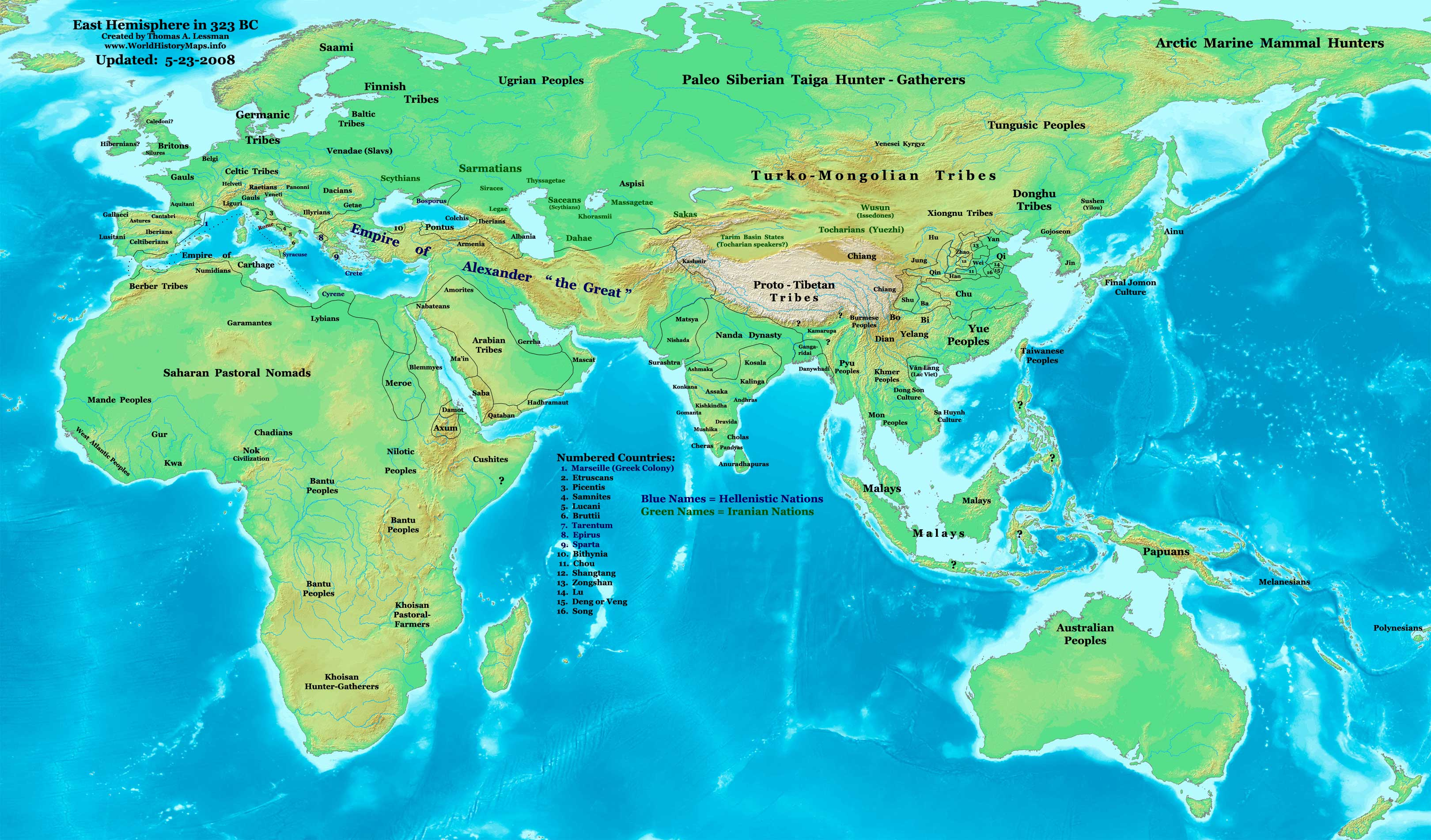
Map of the Eastern Hemisphere in 323 BC, after the passing of Alexander the Great.

This article concerns the period 329 BC – 320 BC.

== Events ==
=== 329 BC ===
==== By place ====
====== Macedonian Empire ======
- From Phrada, Alexander the Great presses on up the valley of the Helmand River, through Arachosia, and over the mountains past the site of modern Kabul into the country of the Paropamisade, where he founds Alexandria by the Caucasus.
- In Bactria, Bessus raises a national revolt in the eastern satrapies using the title of King Artaxerxes V of Persia.
- Crossing the Hindu Kush northward, probably over the Khawak Pass, Alexander brings his army, despite food shortages, to Drapsaka. Outflanked, Bessus flees beyond the Oxus river.
- Marching west to Bactra (Zariaspa), Alexander appoints Artabazus of Phrygia as the satrap of Bactria.
- Crossing the Oxus, Alexander sends his general Ptolemy in pursuit of Bessus. In the meantime, Bessus is overthrown by the Sogdian Spitamenes. Bessus is captured, flogged, and sent to Ptolemy in Bactria with the hope of appeasing Alexander. In due course, Bessus is publicly executed at Ecbatana. With the death of Bessus (Artaxerxes V), Persian resistance to Alexander the Great ceases.
- From Maracanda, Alexander advances through Cyropolis to the Jaxartes river, the boundary of the Persian Empire. There he breaks the opposition of the Scythian nomads by his use of catapults and, after defeating them in a battle on the north bank of the river, pursues them into the interior. On the site of modern Khujand on the Jaxartes, he founds a city, Alexandria Eschate, "the farthest."

=== 328 BC ===
==== By place ====
====== Macedonian Empire ======
- At Maracanda, Alexander murders Cleitus, one of his most trusted commanders, friend and foster-brother, in a drunken quarrel; but his excessive display of remorse leads the army to pass a decree convicting Cleitus posthumously of treason.
- Spitamenes raises all Sogdiana in revolt behind him, bringing in the Massagetae, a people of the Scythian confederacy. He besieges the Macedonian garrison in Maracanda. Alexander the Great sends an army under the command of Pharnuches of Lycia which is promptly annihilated with a loss of more than 2,000 infantry and 300 cavalry.
- Understanding now the danger represented by his enemy, Alexander moves personally to relieve Maracanda, only to learn that Spitamenes has left Sogdiana. Spitamenes then attacks Bactra, from where he is repulsed with great difficulty by the satrap of Bactria, Artabazus of Phrygia.
- Alexander attacks Oxyartes and the remaining Bactrian barons who are holding out in the hills of Paraetacene (modern Tajikistan). The Macedonians seize the crag on which Oxyartes has his stronghold (the Sogdian Rock), and among the captives is his daughter, Roxana. In the reconciliation that follows the battle, Alexander marries Roxana. The rest of Oxyartes' opponents are either won over or crushed.
- December – Spitamenes is badly defeated by Alexander's general Coenus. At this point Spitamenes' allies, feeling the situation desperate, kill their leader and send his head as a gift to Alexander.

=== 327 BC ===
==== By place ====
====== Macedonian Empire ======
- Alexander the Great invades northern India. Recrossing the Hindu Kush, Alexander divides his forces. Half the army with the baggage under Hephaestion and Perdiccas, both cavalry commanders, are sent through the Khyber Pass, while Alexander leads the rest, together with his siege train, through the hills to the north. His advance through Swat and Gandhara is marked by the storming of the almost impregnable pinnacle of Aornos, a few miles west of the Indus.
- The relations between Alexander and Aristotle are embittered by the execution of Aristotle's nephew, the historian Callisthenes of Olynthus, who is charged with treason. Callisthenes has been accompanying Alexander to write a chronicle of the campaign.

====== Roman Republic ======
- The Samnite army captures Neapolis (present-day Naples). The Romans, who are meanwhile moving south while the Samnites are occupied with Tarentum, take the opportunity to recover Neapolis and, after a long siege, evict the Samnite garrison from the city and make it an ally of Rome.

=== 326 BC ===
==== By place ====
====== Macedonian Empire ======
- Spring – Alexander the Great crosses the Indus near Attock and enters ancient Taxila, whose ruler, Taxiles (or Ambhi), furnishes 130 war elephants and troops in return for aid against his rival Porus, who rules the lands between the Hydaspes (modern Jhelum River) and the Acesines (modern Chenab River).
- On the left bank of the Hydaspes, Alexander fights his last great battle, the Battle of the Hydaspes River. He and his general Craterus defeat the Indian King Porus. Alexander founds two cities there, Alexandria on the Indus or Alexandria Nicaea (to celebrate his victory) and Alexandria Bucephalous or Bucephala (named after his horse Bucephalus, which dies there); and Porus becomes his friend and ally.
- Philip, an officer in the service of Alexander the Great, is appointed satrap of India, including the provinces to the west of the Hydaspes, as far south as the junction of the Indus with the Acesines. Philip is put in charge by Alexander of building the city of Alexandria on the Indus.
- Alexander continues on to conquer all the headwaters of the Indus River. East of Porus' kingdom, near the Ganges River, Alexander faces the powerful empire of Magadha ruled by the Nanda dynasty. Fearing the prospects of facing another powerful Indian army and exhausted by years of campaigning, his army mutinies at the Hyphasis River (the modern Beas River) and refuses to march further east, thus making this river mark the easternmost extent of Alexander's conquests.
- Following the mutiny of his army at the Hyphasis River, Alexander is persuaded by his army leaders to abandon his plans for invading the Ganges Valley. Alexander appoints Nearchus, a Cretan with naval experience, as admiral and places under his command all in the ranks of his army with any knowledge of seafaring. Nearchus has Indian shipwrights build 800 vessels, some as large as 300 tons, to take the army through Persian Gulf waters to Babylon. Alexander the Great begins the return march down the Indus to the sea.
- After the departure of Alexander from India, Philip is assassinated by some of the mercenary troops under his command. Alexander names Eudamus and Taxilas as replacement rulers of Philip's territories.

====== Roman Republic ======
- Following their defeat by the Roman forces in Naples, the Samnites declare war on Rome starting the Second Samnite War. To help defeat the Samnites, the Romans make alliances with the peoples of Central Italy to the north of Samnium and with the Apulians to the southeast.

=== 325 BC ===
==== By place ====
====== Europe ======
- (around this year) – Pytheas made a voyage of naval exploration to northwestern Europe, reaching Britain and the Baltic Sea, and mentioning Thule as the farthest island to the north in the Atlantic.

====== Macedonian Empire ======
- Alexander the Great leaves India and nominates his officer Peithon, son of Agenor, as the satrap of the region around the Indus.
- Alexander the Great orders his admiral, Nearchus, to sail from the Hydaspes River in western India to the Persian Gulf and up the Euphrates River to Babylon while Alexander's army starts marching through Gedrosia (Baluchistan).
- While returning to Persia, Alexander's army runs into the Malli clans (in modern day Multan). The ensuing battle severely weakens his army. Alexander sends much of his remaining army to Carmania (modern southern Iran) with his general Craterus, while he leads the rest of his forces back to Persia by the southern route through the Gedrosian Desert (now part of southern Iran and Makran in southern Pakistan).
- By the end of the year, Alexander's army reaches Persepolis, while his navy, under Nearchus, reaches Susa at around the same time.
- The first known reference to sugar cane appears in writings by Alexander the Great's admiral Nearchus, who writes of Indian reeds "that produce honey, although there are no bees".

====== Sicily ======
- Agathocles, a rich and ambitious citizen of Syracuse, is exiled for attempting to overthrow the oligarchic party in the city.

====== China ======
- Going against his loyalty to the figurehead monarch of the Zhou dynasty, the Qin ruler, Duke Huiwen, takes on the title of King Huiwen, claiming royal title and sparking a trend amongst other Warring States rulers to do the same.
- King Wuling ascends to the throne of Zhao.

====== Americas ======
- La Venta, an Olmec island city, is believed to be completely abandoned by this time.

==== By topic ====
====== Art ======
- The fourth-century (Late Classical) period of sculpture ends in Ancient Greece and is succeeded by the Hellenistic period (approximate date).

====== Philosophy ======
- Aristotle writes Ta Ethika on virtue and moral character (approximate date).

=== 324 BC ===
==== By place ====
====== Macedonian Empire ======
- On returning to Susa, Persia, Alexander the Great punishes those who he considers to have failed in their duties in his absence in India, particularly those who have plundered tombs and temples. Alexander continues his policy of replacing senior officials and executing defaulting governors. Over a third of his satraps are replaced and six are put to death. Three generals in Media, including Cleander, the brother of Coenus (who died in 326 BC), are accused of extortion and are arrested, tried and executed.
- While at Susa, Alexander holds a feast to celebrate his capture of the Persian Empire.
- To further his policy of integrating the Macedonians and Persians, Alexander and 80 of his officers take Persian wives. He and Hephaestion marry Darius III's daughters Barsine (also called Stateira) and Drypteis, respectively, and 10,000 of his soldiers with native wives are given generous dowries. His determination to incorporate Persians on equal terms into his army and into the administration of the provinces is bitterly resented by the Macedonians.
- Alexander the Great spends the summer and autumn at the Median capital, Ecbatana, where his best friend, Hephaistion, dies during the autumn. Alexander indulges in extravagant mourning for his closest friend.
- Winter – Alexander carries out a savage punitive expedition against the Cossaeans in the hills of Luristan.

====== Greece ======
- Alexander the Great's treasurer, Harpalus, fearing arrest, flees from Susa to Athens. On arriving in Athens, he is imprisoned by the Athenians after a proposal of Demosthenes and Phocion, despite Hypereides' opposition, who wanted an immediate uprising against Alexander. Harpalus brings with him considerable wealth collected from the spoils of Alexander's conquest of Asia. This money is entrusted to a committee led by Demosthenes.
- Dinarchus, a professional speech writer in Athens, comes to prominence in the scandal that follows the flight to Athens of Alexander the Great's treasurer, Harpalus. When Harpalus escapes and flees to Crete, Dinarchus writes the prosecution speeches against Demosthenes, Demades, Aristogiton, Philocles and other well-known politicians accused of misappropriating some of this money.
- Demosthenes is convicted and imprisoned after being found guilty of misappropriating some of the funds that Alexander's treasurer, Harpalus, has brought with him. He escapes into exile, although his sentence is soon repealed. Although Hypereides has supported Demosthenes in his struggle against the Macedonians, that support is withdrawn after the Harpalus affair. After Demosthenes' exile, Hypereides becomes the head of the patriotic party in Athens.
- Greek colonists found the city of Akra Leuka (modern Alicante, Spain) on the Mediterranean coast of the Iberian Peninsula.

=== 323 BC ===
==== By place ====
====== Macedonian Empire ======
- Alexander orders demolition of the ziggurat at Etemenanki.
- 10 June/11 June – In Babylon, Alexander the Great dies, ten days after being taken ill after a prolonged banquet and drinking bout. Diogenes, the philosopher he met years before, when he was just about to set out on his conquests, allegedly dies on the exact same day.
- The Partition of Babylon sets out the division of the territories conquered by Alexander the Great between his generals. The partition is a result of a compromise, essentially brokered by Eumenes, following a conflict of opinion between the party of Meleager, who wishes to give full power to Philip III (the illegitimate son of King Philip II of Macedon by Philinna of Larissa), and the party of Perdiccas, who wishes to wait for the birth of the heir of Alexander and his wife, Roxana (the future Alexander IV) to give him the throne under the control of a regent.
- Under the agreement, Philip III becomes king, but Perdiccas, as the regent, effectively becomes the ruler of Alexander's empire. Perdiccas manages the partition of the territories between the former generals and saintly with Alexander's chief lieutenant Craterus);
  - Laomedon governing Syria and Phoenicia;
  - Philotas looking after Cilicia;
  - Peithon taking Media;
  - Antigonus gaining the governorship of Pamphylia and Lycia;
  - Leonnatus with Phrygia;
  - Neoptolemus with Armenia;
  - Ptolemy as governor of Egypt;
  - Eumenes of Cardia as governor of Cappadocia and Paphlagonia; and
  - Lysimachus becomes governor of Thrace.
- Perdiccas exercises a wide authority in Asia as "supreme general". Perdiccas largely leaves Alexander's arrangements intact:
  - Taxiles and Porus are to rule over their kingdoms in India;
  - Alexander's father-in-law Oxyartes rules Gandhara;
  - Sibyrtius governs Arachosia and Gedrosia;
  - Stasanor rules in Aria and Drangiana;
  - Philip controls Bactria and Sogdiana;
  - Phrataphernes rules Parthia and Hyrcania;
  - Peucestas governs Persis;
  - Tlepolemus is left in charge of Carmania;
  - Atropates governs northern Media;
  - Archon of Pella controls Babylonia; and
  - Arcesilas rules northern Mesopotamia.
- Meleager and about 300 of his partisans are killed by forces loyal to Perdiccas. The first wife of Alexander, Roxana, arranges for Alexander's second wife, Stateira II (Barsine), to be killed.

====== Greece ======
- Some Greek cities, including Athens, revolt against the Macedonian regent, Antipater, following the news of Alexander's death. Athens' actions are incited by the speeches of the Athenian general Leosthenes and the Athenian orator Hypereides. Joined by cities in central and south Greece, the Athenians defeat Antipater in battle. They force him to take refuge in Lamia, where he is besieged for several months by the Greek allies.
- The Greek philosopher and scientist, Aristotle, faces a strong anti-Macedonian reaction in Athens following the death of Alexander the Great. Aristotle is accused of impiety by the Athenians. However, he escapes to Chalcis in Euboea.
- Theophrastus, who has been studying in Athens under Aristotle, becomes the head of the Lyceum, the academy in Athens founded by Aristotle, when Aristotle is forced to leave Athens.
- Following Alexander the Great's death, the Athenians recall Demosthenes from exile and provide the money to pay his fine.

=== 322 BC ===
==== By place ====
====== Greece ======
- Spring/summer – The Macedonian admiral Cleitus the White defeats the Athenian navy at the Battle of the Echinades and the Battle of Amorgos, ending Athenian thalassocracy in the Aegean.
- The Athenians and their allies' siege of the Macedonian ruler, Antipater, in Lamia is relieved by Leonnatus with an army of 20,000 infantry and 1,500 cavalry. Leonnatus is killed in the action.
- September 5 – Craterus arrives to defeat the Athenians in the Battle of Crannon. This battle marks a complete victory for Antipater in the Lamian War.
- The Athenian orator and diplomat, Demades, regains his citizenship so that he and Phocion can negotiate a peace with Antipater, thus concluding the Lamian War. Before setting out he persuades the citizens of Athens to pass the death sentence upon Demosthenes and his followers (including Hypereides, leader of the Athenian patriotic party). Demades' embassy results in a peace disadvantageous to the Athenians, with the Athenians forced to accept the occupation of Athens' port, Piraeus, by the Macedonians.
- Demosthenes flees from the Macedonians who demand his surrender. Upon being arrested, he takes poison and dies.
- Hypereides flees to Aegina only to be captured by the Macedonians at the temple of Poseidon and put to death.
- The League of Corinth is dissolved.

====== Egypt ======
- By custom, kings in Macedonia assert their right to the throne by burying their predecessor. To pre-empt Perdiccas, the imperial regent, Ptolemy has Alexander the Great's body brought to Memphis, Egypt and buried there in a gold sarcophagus. Ptolemy then marries Alexander's mistress, Thaïs and commences to reign as king of Egypt and the adjacent Libyan and Arabian regions.
- Ptolemy, taking advantage of internal disturbances, acquires the African Hellenic towns of Cyrenaica without the authority of Perdiccas.
- Ptolemy executes his deputy, Cleomenes of Naucratis, on the suspicion that Cleomenes favours Perdiccas. This action removes the chief check on his authority, and allows Ptolemy to obtain the sizable funds that Cleomenes has accumulated.

====== India ======
- Chandragupta Maurya captures Magadha: Chandragupta, with the help of Chanakya (Kautilya), who is also known as the Indian Machiavelli, destroys the Nanda rulers of Magadha and establishes the Maurya Empire. It is said that Chanakya met Chandragupta in the Vindhya forest, after being insulted by the Nanda king.

=== 321 BC ===
==== By place ====
====== Macedonian Empire ======
- Antipater appoints Antigonus commander in chief of his army in Asia Minor and sends him with Craterus to fight against Eumenes, the satrap of Cappadocia and a supporter of Perdiccas.
- Leaving Eumenes to hold Asia Minor against Craterus and Antigonus, Perdiccas marches against Ptolemy, but when he fails to cross the Nile he is murdered by mutinous officers. Prominent among the mutineers is Seleucus. A truce is arranged, leaving Ptolemy in power in Egypt and Seleucus in power in Babylon.
- The key remaining generals (diadochi) of the late Alexander the Great agree to the Partition of Triparadisus (a town in northern Syria). This is a power-sharing agreement providing for a new regent to replace Perdiccas and it repartitions the satrapies of the empire that has been created by Alexander the Great. It follows but modifies the Partition of Babylon made two years earlier following the death of Alexander the Great. Under the agreement, Antipater becomes the regent of the Macedonian Empire on behalf of the two kings: the intellectually retarded Philip III Arrhidaeus and the infant Alexander IV of Macedon while Ptolemy is confirmed in possession of Egypt and Cyrene.
- Ptolemy further strengthens his position amongst the diadochi by marrying Eurydice, the third daughter of Antipater.
- Antigonus and Craterus defeat Eumenes in battle but Eumenes escapes. Antigonus and Craterus then besiege him unsuccessfully in the mountain fortress of Nora on the border between Cappadocia and Lycaonia. Craterus is killed during the fighting against Eumenes when his charging horse (Diodorus) falls over him.

====== Roman Republic ======
- Continuing successes by Rome's armies against the Samnites forces the Samnites to sue for peace. However, the terms offered by Rome are so stringent that they are rejected by the Samnites and the war goes on.
- Two Roman consuls, Spurius Postumius Albinus and Titus Veturius Calvinus, leading an invading force into Samnium, are trapped in a mountain pass known as the Caudine Forks (Caudium) near Beneventum, where they can neither advance nor retire, and after a desperate struggle, they are forced to submit to the humiliating terms imposed by the Samnite victor, Gaius Pontius. The captured consuls pledge themselves to a five-year treaty on terms most favourable for the Samnites.

====== India ======
- Chandragupta Maurya, founder of the Mauryan empire, establishes himself as the king of Magadha.

=== 320 BC ===
==== By place ====
====== Macedonian Empire ======
- Alexander the Great's various generals control different parts of Alexander's empire. Ptolemy controls Egypt, Seleucus controls Babylon and Syria, Antipater and his son Cassander control Macedon and Greece, Antigonus controls Phrygia and other parts of Asia Minor, Lysimachus controls Thrace and Pergamum and Eumenes controls the Cappadocia and Pontus areas.
- Judea and Syria are annexed by Ptolemy and he gives Judea a large measure of self-government.
- Eudemus makes himself master of the territories of the Indian king Porus, and treacherously puts that monarch to death.

==== By topic ====
====== Biology ======
- Theophrastus begins the systematic study of botany.

====== Demography ======
- Alexandria in Macedonian Egypt becomes the largest city of the world, taking over the lead from Babylon in Macedonian Babylonia.

== Births ==
327 BC

- Heracles, illegitimate son of Alexander the Great by his mistress Barsine, daughter of Satrap Artabazus of Phrygia and later claimant to the throne of Macedon (d. 309 BC)
- Moggaliputta-Tissa, Indian Buddhist monk, scholar and philosopher (approximate date)

326 BC

- Pharnavaz I of Iberia, later King of Iberia

325 BC

- Euclid, Greek mathematician who will come to live in Alexandria (d. c. 275 BC)
- Gongsun Long, Chinese scholar and philosopher (approximate date)
- Zhaoxiang of Qin, Chinese king of the Qin State (d. 250 BC)

324 BC

- Antiochus I Soter, King of the Seleucid dynasty (d. 261 BC)

323 BC

- Alexander IV of Macedon, son of Alexander the Great and Roxana (d. 309 BC).

320 BC

- Timocharis of Alexandria, Greek astronomer responsible for the first recorded observation of Mercury and the first star catalogue (d. 260 BC)
- Bindusara, the heir to the throne of the Mauryan Empire, is born. (d. 272 BC)

== Deaths ==
329 BC

- Bessus (Artaxerxes V), Persian nobleman and satrap of Bactria, and later the last claimant to the Achaemenid throne of Persia

328 BC

- Cleitus, lieutenant and friend of Alexander the Great (b. c. 375 BC)
- Spitamenes, Persian nobleman (b. 370 BC)
- Artabazos II, Persian general and satrap (fl. 389 BC)

327 BC

- Callisthenes of Olynthus, Greek historian, great nephew and pupil of Aristotle (b. c. 360 BC)

326 BC

- Coenus, son of Polemocrates and son-in-law of Parmenion and one of Alexander the Great's generals in his Persian and Indian expeditions

324 BC

- October – Hephaestion, son of Amyntor, a Macedonian general, soldier, aristocrat, and possibly lover of Alexander the Great (b. c. 356 BC).

323 BC

- June 13 – Alexander the Great, king of Macedonia and conqueror of the Persian Empire died in Babylon (b. 356 BC)
- Diogenes of Sinope, Greek philosopher (b. c. 412 BC)
- Meleager, Macedonian general who has served with Alexander the Great

322 BC

- October 12 – Demosthenes, Athenian statesman, recognized as the greatest of ancient Greek orators (b. 384 BC)
- Ariarathes I of Cappadocia, Achaemenid satrap, founder of the Iranian Ariarathid dynasty
- Aristotle, Greek philosopher and scientist (b. 384 BC)
- Cleomenes of Naucratis, Greek deputy to the Macedonian ruler of Egypt, Ptolemy
- Hypereides, Athenian orator (b. 390 BC)
- Leonnatus, Macedonian officer under Alexander the Great and one of the diadochi (b. 356 BC)

321 BC

- Craterus, Macedonian general (b. c. 370 BC)
- Perdiccas, Macedonian general and regent after the death of Alexander the Great (b. c. 365 BC)
- Zhou Xian Wang, King of the Zhou Dynasty of China

320 BC

- Anaximenes of Lampsacus, Greek rhetorician and historian (b. c. 380 BC)
- Menaechmus, Greek mathematician and geometer
- Zoilus, Greek grammarian, cynic philosopher and literary critic from Amphipolis in Macedon (b. c. 400 BC)
