= Partition of Triparadisus =

321 BC power-sharing agreement between the generals of Alexander the Great

The Partition of Triparadisus was a power-sharing agreement passed at Triparadisus in 321 BC between the generals (Diadochi) of Alexander the Great, in which they named a new regent and arranged the repartition of the satrapies of Alexander's empire among themselves. It followed and modified the Partition of Babylon made in 323 BC upon Alexander's death.

Following the death of Alexander, the rule of his empire was given to his half-brother Philip Arrhidaeus and Alexander's son Alexander IV. However, since Philip was mentally ill and Alexander IV born only after the death of his father, a regent was named as Perdiccas; in the meantime, the former generals of Alexander were named satraps of the various regions of his empire.

Several satraps were eager to gain more power, and when Ptolemy I Soter, satrap of Egypt, rebelled with other generals, Perdiccas moved against the former but was killed by a mutiny in his camp. Ptolemy declined the regency and instead brought to the office Peithon and Arrhidaeus. This designation met the strong opposition of Eurydice, wife of Philip III. In the meeting called in 321 BC at Triparadisus of all the generals, Antipater was chosen to be a new regent. The meeting also proceeded to divide again the satrapies between the various generals.

== The treaty ==
Arrian described the result of the meeting in Events after Alexander, which were transmitted to us by the patriarch Photius (820–897):

"Then and there Antipater made a new division of Asia, wherein he partly confirmed the former and partly annulled it, according as the exigency of affairs required. For, in the first place, Egypt with Libya, and all the vast waste beyond it, and whatever else had been acquired to the westward, he assigned to Ptolemy;

- Syria to Laomedon of Mytilene;
- Cilicia to Philoxenus, for he held it before.
- Among the higher provinces, Mesopotamia and Arbelitis were bestowed on Amphimachus, the king's brother;
- Babylonia, on Seleucus;
- the prefecture of all the province of Susa, on Antigenes, who was captain of the Macedonian Argyraspides, and had first opposed Perdiccas.
- Peucestas was confirmed in his government of Persis.
- Tlepolemus in Carmania,
- and Peithon in that of Media, as far as the Caspian Gates.
- Philip in Parthia.
- Stasander in Aria and Drangiana.
- Stasanor the Solian, over Bactria and Sogdiana;
- and Sibyrtius over Arachosia.
- The country of the Parapamisians was bestowed upon Oxyartes, the father of Roxana;
- and the skirts of India adjacent to Mount Parapamisus, on Peithon the son of Agenor.
- As to the countries beyond that, those on the river Indus, with the city Patala (the capital of that part of India) were assigned to Porus.
- Those upon the Hydaspes, to Taxiles the Indian;

for it was deemed no easy matter to dispossess those who had been confirmed in their territories by Alexander himself, their power was grown so strong.

- Of the countries to the northward of Mount Taurus, Cappadocia was assigned to Nicanor;
- Phrygia, Lycaonia, Pamphylia, and Lycia, as before, to Antigonus.
- Caria to Asander;
- Lydia to Cleitus;
- and Hellespontine Phrygia to Arrhidaeus.

Antigenes was deputed collector of the tribute in the province of Susa, and three thousand of those Macedonians who were the most ready to mutiny, appointed to attend him.

Moreover, he appointed Autolychus the son of Agathocles, Amyntas the son of Alexander and brother of Peucestas, Ptolemy the son of Ptolemy, and Alexander the son of Polyperchon, as guards to surround the king's person.

To his son Cassander he gave the command of the horse; and to Antigonus, the troops that had before been assigned to Perdiccas, and the care and custody of the king's person, with order to prosecute the war against Eumenes. Which done, Antipater himself departed home, much applauded by all, for his wise and prudent management" (Translation John Rooke)

	Partition of Babylon			Partition of Triparadisus	
Role or Region	Diodorus Siculus	Justin	Arrian+ / Dexippus*	Diodorus Siculus	Arrian
King of Macedon	Philip III	Philip III	Philip III+	Philip III and Alexander IV	Philip III and Alexander IV
Regent	Perdiccas	Perdiccas	Perdiccas+	Antipater	Antipater
Commander of the Companions	Seleucus	Seleucus	n/a	Cassander	Cassander
Commander of the Guards	n/a	Cassander	n/a	n/a	n/a
Macedon	Antipater	Antipater	Antipater+* and Craterus+	Antipater	Antipater
Illyria	Antipater	Philo	Antipater+* and Craterus+	Antipater	Antipater
Epirus	Antipater	n/a	Antipater+* and Craterus+	Antipater	Antipater
Greece	Antipater	Antipater	Antipater+* and Craterus+	Antipater	Antipater
Thrace	Lysimachus	Lysimachus	Lysimachus+*	Lysimachus	Lysimachus
Hellespontine Phrygia	Leonnatus	Leonnatus+*	Leonnatus	Arrhidaeus	Arrhidaeus
Greater Phrygia	Antigonus	Antigonus	Antigonus+*	Antigonus	Antigonus
Pamphylia	Antigonus	Nearchus	Antigonus+*	Antigonus	Antigonus
Lycia	Antigonus	Nearchus	Antigonus+*	Antigonus	Antigonus
Caria	Asander	Cassander	Cassander+	Asander	Asander
Lydia	Menander	Menander	Menander+*	Cleitus the White	Cleitus the White
Cappadocia	Eumenes	Eumenes	Eumenes+*	Nicanor	Nicanor
Paphlagonia	Eumenes	Eumenes	Eumenes+*	Nicanor?	Nicanor?
Cilicia	Philotas	Philotas	Philotas+*	Philoxenus	Philoxenus
Egypt	Ptolemy	Ptolemy	Ptolemy+*	Ptolemy	Ptolemy
Syria	Laomedon	Laomedon	Laomedon+*	Laomedon	Laomedon
Mesopotamia	Arcesilaus	Arcesilaus	Arcesilaus*	Amphimachus	Amphimachus
Babylonia	Archon	Peucestas	Seleucus*	Seleucus	Seleucus
Pelasgia	n/a	Archon	n/a	n/a	n/a
Greater Media	Peithon	Atropates	Peithon*	Peithon	Peithon
Lesser Media	Atropates	Atropates	n/a	n/a	n/a
Susiana	n/a	Scynus	n/a	Antigenes	Antigenes
Persia	Peucestas	Tlepolemus	Peucestas*	Peucestas	Peucestas
Carmania	Tlepolemus	n/a	Neoptolemus*	Tlepolemus	Tlepolemus
Armenia	n/a	Phrataphernes	n/a	n/a	n/a
Hyrcania	Phrataphernes	Philip	Phrataphernes	Philip?	Philip?
Parthia	Phrataphernes	Nicanor	n/a	Philip	Philip
Sogdiana	Philip	Scythaeus	Philip*	Stasanor	Stasanor
Bactria	Philip	Amyntas	n/a ^{1}	Stasanor	Stasanor
Drangiana	Stasanor	Stasanor	Stasanor*	Stasander	Stasander
Aria	Stasanor	Stasanor	Stasanor*	Stasander	Stasander
Arachosia	Sibyrtius	Sibyrtius	Sibyrtius*	n/a	Sibyrtius
Gedrosia	Sibyrtius	Sibyrtius	Sibyrtius*	n/a	Sibyrtius? ^{2}
Paropamisia	Oxyartes	Oxyartes? ^{3}	Oxyartes*	Oxyartes	Oxyartes
Punjab	Taxiles	Taxiles	Taxiles*	Taxiles	Taxiles
Indus	Porus	Peithon, son of Agenor	Porus*	Porus	Porus
Gandhara	Peithon, son of Agenor	Peithon, son of Agenor	Peithon, son of Agenor	Peithon, son of Agenor	Peithon, son of Agenor
Table notes	^{1 = There is a suggestion in Dexippus and Arrian that Oxyartes was left as satrap of Bactria 2 = Not explicitly stated, but probable 3 = Reading Oxyartes for Justin's "Extarches"}				

== Bibliography ==
- Siculus, Diodorus (1933). Library of History. Translated by Charles Henry Oldfather and Russel M. Greer. London, United Kingdom: Loeb Classical Library/Heinemann – via University of Chicago.
- Pitt, Evan M. (27 October 2016). Miles, Graeme (ed.). The contest for Macedon: a study on the conflict between Cassander and Polyperchon (319 – 308 B.C.) (PDF). UTAS School of Humanities (PhD). Hobart, Tasmania: University of Tasmania (UTAS).
- Photius (1920). Pearse, Roger (ed.). Bibliotheca. Translated by John Henry Freese. London, United Kingdom: Society for Promoting Christian Knowledge. OCLC 156081816 – via The Tertullian Project.
