= Parietae =

The Parietae or Paryetae, were a tribe, in the district of Paropamisis, in Bactria near the Hinu Kush ranges in northern Afghanistan during antiquity.

During the Hellenistic and Persian Empires they lived in the satrapy of the Paropanisadai, but latter came under the rule of Demetrius I of Bactria, ruling Greek Bactria from Kupisa.
