= Peithon (son of Agenor) =

Macedonian army officer (died 312 BC)

Peithon (Ancient Greek: Πείθων) (died 312 BC), son of Agenor (Αγήνωρ) was an officer in the expedition of Alexander the Great to India, who became satrap of the Indus from 325 to 316 BC, and then satrap of Babylon, from 316 to 312 BC, until he died at the Battle of Gaza in 312 BC.

== Officer ==
Peithon was very successful in his Indian campaigns, first mentioned as the commander of a phalanx battalion in January 325 in the Mallian Campaign (Indian Mâlava) in the southern Punjab.

== Satrap of the Indus (325–316 BC) ==
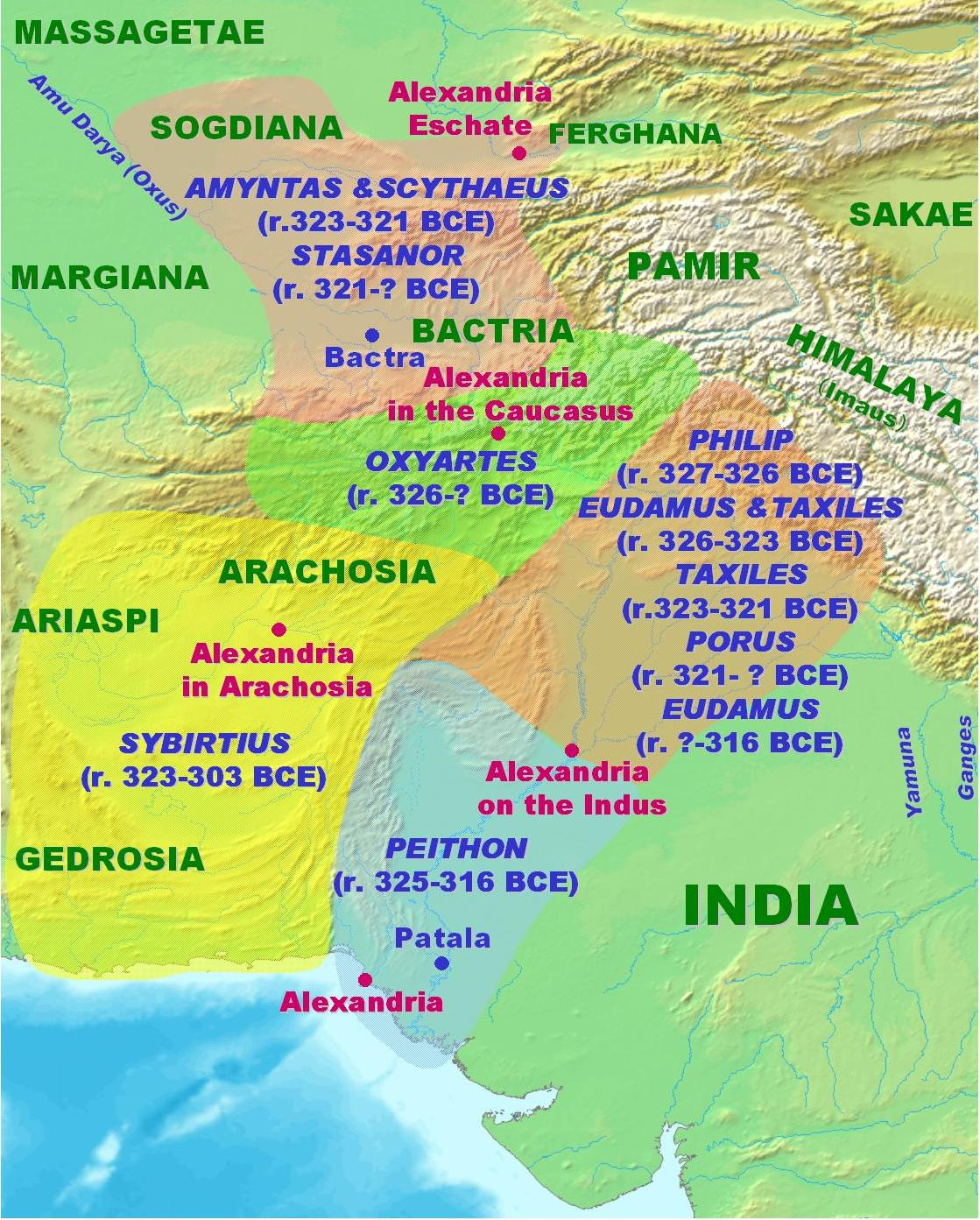
Peithon ruled the southern dominions of the Indus, from the junction of the Indus and the Acesines, to the sea.

After these deeds, Alexander named him viceroy of the Indus area, around 325 BC, to the east of the territory held in the Paropamisadae by the satrap Oxyartes and to the south of the territories where Philip, son of Machatas was satrap:

"He (Alexander) appointed Peithon viceroy of the land extending from the confluence of the Indus and Acesines as far as the sea, together with all the coast-land of India" Arrian Anabasis Book 6b

Later, Peithon managed putting down the revolt of king Musicanus (Indian: Mûshika) at the head of the Indus:

"Meantime he was informed that Musicanus had revolted. He dispatched the viceroy, Peithon, son of Agenor, with a sufficient army against him, while he himself marched against the cities which had been put under the rule of Musicanus. Some of these he razed to the ground, reducing the inhabitants to slavery; and into others he introduced garrisons and fortified the citadels. After accomplishing this, he returned to the camp and fleet. By this time Musicanus had been captured by Peithon, who was bringing him to Alexander." Arrian Anabasis Book 6b

Peithon was confirmed in his position at the Partition of Babylon following the death of Alexander in 323 BC:

"To the colonies settled in India, Python, the son of Agenor, was sent." Justin XIII.4

According to the text of the Partition of Triparadisus in 321 BC, Peithon was again confirmed in his dominion over the area beyond the Hindu-Kush:

"The country of the Parapamisians was bestowed upon Oxyartes, the father of Roxane; and the skirts of India adjacent to Mount Parapamisus, on Peithon the son of Agenor. As to the countries beyond that, those on the river Indus, with the city Patala (the capital of that part of India) were assigned to Porus. Those upon the Hydaspes, to Taxiles the Indian." Arrian "Anabasis, the Events after Alexander"

According to other sources, he was also at one point satrap of the Punjab.

In 317 BC, another Peithon, the satrap of Media, tried to control the eastern rulers of the Empire. Macedonians troops from India were sent west to combat him, weakening the Greek positions in India. Peithon, son of Agenor, left India in 316 BC for Babylon (Diod. XIX, 56, 4).

About that time, Chandragupta Maurya began conquering the northwestern territories held by the Greeks.

== Satrap of Babylon (315–312 BC) ==
In 315 BC, Peithon, son of Agenor, was named satrap of Babylonia by Antigonus Monophthalmus, and participated on his side in his fight against Cassander and Ptolemy in 314 BC. Peithon was together with Nearchus, a former admiral of Alexander, assisting Demetrius, the son of Antigonus. At the Battle of Gaza in autumn 312 BC, the Egyptian side under Ptolemy won, and Peithon was killed in action.

It is unknown what happened in India right after his departure, but ancient sources reported that the prefects of Greek territories were assassinated in the Indian uprisings led by Chandragupta Maurya:

"India, after the death of Alexander, had assassinated his prefects, as if shaking the burden of servitude. The author of this liberation was Sandracottos (Chandragupta), but he had transformed liberation in servitude after victory, since, after taking the throne, he himself oppressed the very people he has liberated from foreign domination" Justin XV.4.12-13
