= Arcesilaus (satrap) =

General of Alexander the great

Arcesilaus (Greek: Ἀρκεσίλαος) was one of Alexander the Great's generals.

Following the death of Alexander, Arcesilaus was allotted Mesopotamia in the Partition of Babylon in 323 BCE, which he may have administered since as early as 331 BCE. He supported Perdiccas, and may have been deposed or forced to flee his satrapy for this reason. Nothing concrete is known about him after 323 BCE, but it is also believed that he may have been an opponent of Seleucus. In any case, by the Partition of Triparadisus in 320 BCE, Arcesilaus had fallen from influence, as he was replaced in his satrapy by Amphimachus.
