= Philip (son of Machatas) =

Builder of Alexandria on the Indus

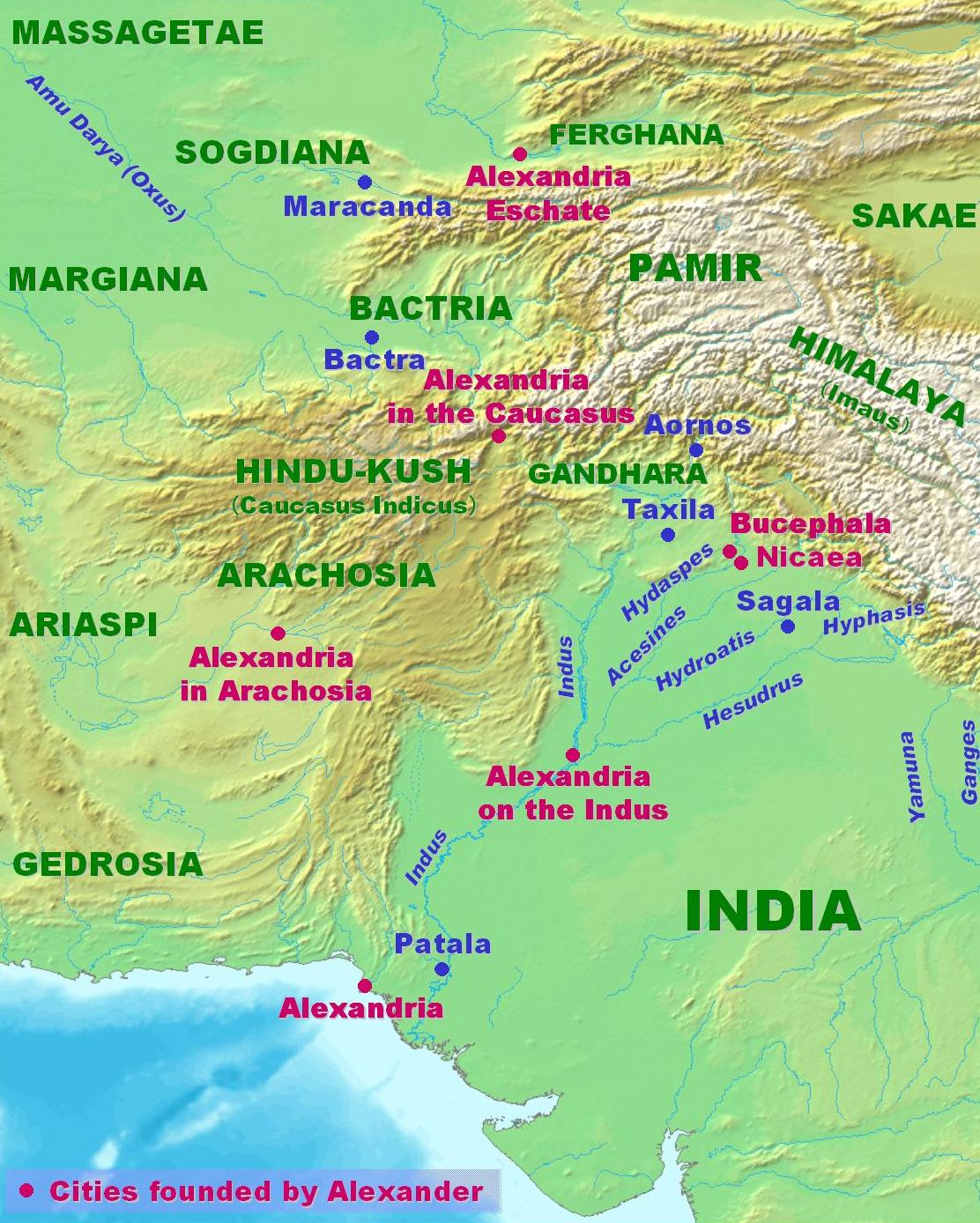
- Philip ruled the northern dominions of the Indus, down to the junction of the Indus and the Acesines
- Died: 325 BC

Philip (Greek: Φίλιππος; died 325 BC), son of Machatas and brother of Harpalus, was an officer in the service of Alexander the Great, who in 327 BC was appointed by Alexander as satrap of India, including the provinces westward of the Hydaspes (Jhelum river), as far south as the junction of the Indus with the Acesines (Chenab river). After the Mallian campaign of the and Oxydracae, these tribes also were added to his government.

Philip was put in charge by Alexander of building the city of Alexandria on the Indus.

The territory south of the junction of the Indus with the Acesines (Chenab river) to the sea was given to Oxyartes and Peithon, son of Agenor (Arrian, Anabasis of Alexander VI.15.4)

== Death ==
After the departure of Alexander from India, Philip was assassinated in 325 BC by a conspiracy formed among the mercenary troops under his command. Alexander named Eudamus and Taxiles as rulers of his territories in replacement:

"Alexander dispatched letters to India to Eudamus and Taxilas telling them to take charge of the district formerly under Philip, until he himself sent a satrap to govern it." (Arrian, Anabasis of Alexander, VI.27.2)
