= Capture of Neapolis =

327 BC battle during the Second Samnite War

Coordinates: 40.8333°N 14.2500°E

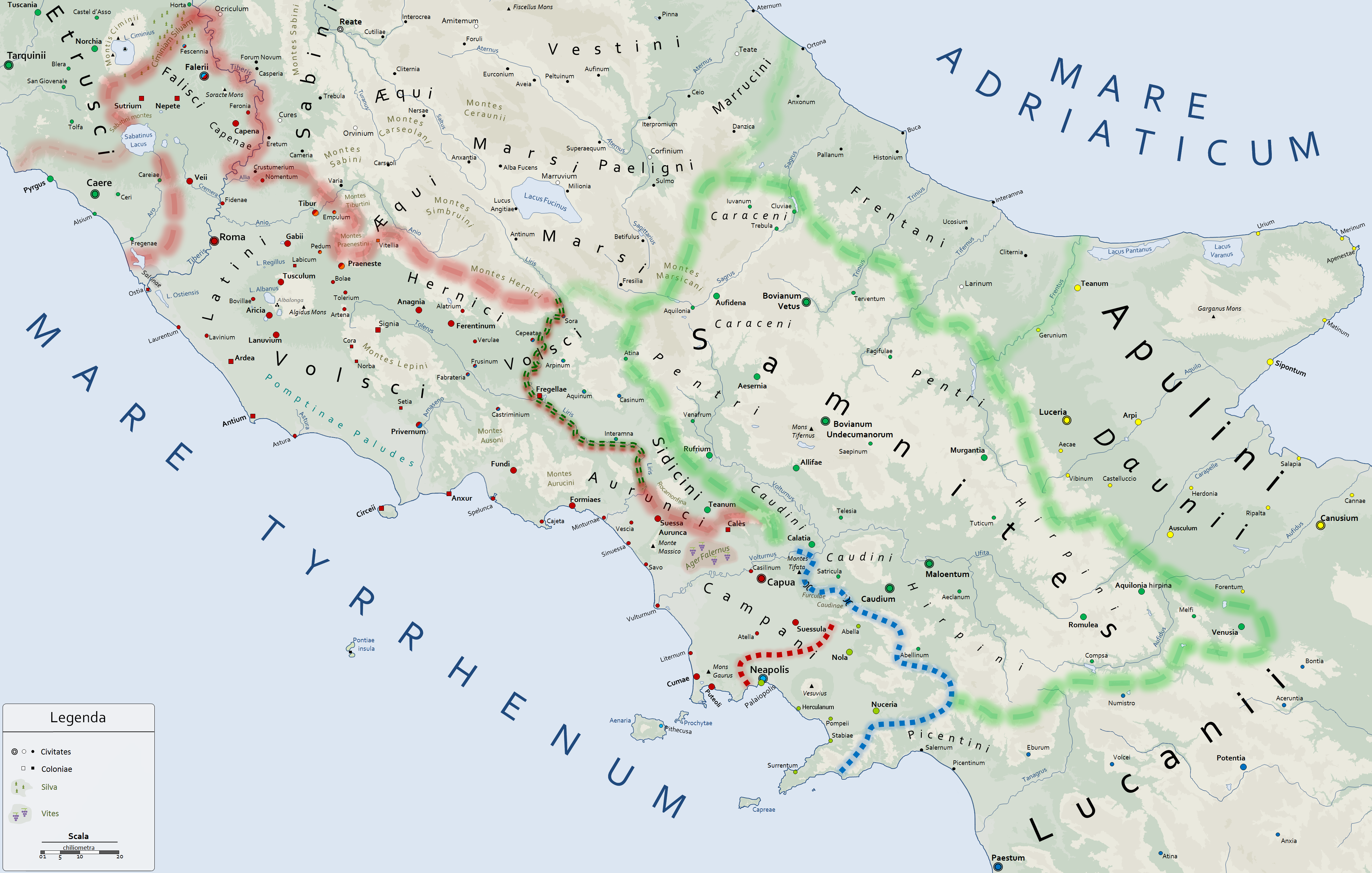
Capture of Neapolis

The Capture of Neapolis took place during the Second Samnite War in 327 BC, when the Romans seized the city of Neapolis from the Samnites, an ancient Italic people who lived in Samnium. The city's fall is attributed to treachery committed by some of its citizens.

== Prelude ==
A treaty between the Romans and the Samnites in 354 BC set a southern border with Samnium, which ran from the middle of the Liris River valley to southern Campania.

In 334 BC, the Romans advanced into the Liris valley, which the Samnites found that to be an unacceptable intrusion by Rome, but were too preoccupied to respond at the time as they were involved in a conflict with the Greek colony of Tarentum and its ally, Alexander of Epirus.

In 328 BC, the Romans established a colony at Fregellae on the Liris River and another at Cales. Then they confronted the Samnites in the Liris River valley, sparking the Second Samnite War, or Great Samnite War (326–304 BC), which would last for over twenty years.

== Roman-Samnite tensions ==
The Romans had adopted a policy of supporting the more civilized and peaceful low-landers against their enemies. This led to the incorporation of the cities of northern Campania into the Roman state. The Samnites did not originally see this Roman annexation as a hostile act. However, this contributed to Roman forays into Liris River valley and eventually led to a protracted struggle between Rome and Samnium. This situation was despite the Romans using Samnite forces to help in subduing the Latins in a previous war. Rome's incursion into Samnite territory in 328 BC aggravated the situation.

== Battle ==
In trying to capture Neapolis, the Romans tried both a blockade and assault but without success, so they resorted to treachery. The city was already shifting; citizens no longer sided with the Samnites. Citizens hatched a plot to allow the Roman forces entry into the city under the cover of night. They let a Roman contingent in through a postern gate. The Samnite forces were at the port awaiting reinforcements and were ambushed by the Roman force. Caught by surprise, the Samnites were defeated and Neapolis fell to Rome. The city was treated favourably by the Romans for switching sides during the conflict.

The capture of Neapolis was just one of the numerous conflicts during a war that was to last for over 20 years and exact tremendous sacrifices from both sides.
