= Triparadeisos =

Ancient settlement in Lebanon

Triparadeisos or Triparadisus (Greek: Τριπαράδεισος) was a settlement in Syria near the sources of the Orontes River. A paradeisos was a hunting reserve or pleasure-ground for the nobility of the Achaemenid (Persian) Empire, normally a walled-in area with groves of trees, wild animals, and running water.

Triparadeisos was the place where the Treaty of Triparadisus occurred, in which Alexander the Great's Empire was divided between his generals in 321 BC. It has been suggested that it was at the site of Roman Heliopolis (modern Baalbek). Heliopolis was a colony of the Roman Empire in what is now Lebanon. The name was Colonia Julia Augusta Felix Heliopolitana.

== History ==
Ancient Heliopolis -named Triparadeisos- initially formed part of the Diadochi kingdoms of Egypt & Syria. It had a small population of one thousand inhabitants during Alexander times.

It was annexed by the Romans during their eastern wars. The Italic settlers of the Roman colony "Colonia Julia Augusta Felix Heliopolitana" may have arrived as early as the time of Caesar but were more probably the veterans of two Roman Legions under Augustus, during which time it hosted a Roman garrison.

Indeed the veterans of two Roman legions were established in the city (and region) of Berytus by emperor Augustus: the fifth Macedonian and the third Gallic, and Heliopolis from 15 BC to 193 AD formed part of the territory of Berytus. The population -probably nearly 15,000 inhabitants- was mainly local in the second century under Hadrian with a few descendants of the Roman colonists and likely varied seasonally with market fairs and the schedules of the caravans to the coast and interior.

According to Schlumberger, during the Roman conquest the city's temple to Baʿal & Haddu was conflated first with the worship of the Greek sun god Helios and then with the Greek and Roman sky god under the name "Heliopolitan Zeus" or "Jupiter". The present Temple of Jupiter (the biggest in Antiquity) presumably replaced an earlier one of Triparadeisos using the same foundations.
