= Menander (general) =

Ancient Greek general

Menander (Ancient Greek: Μένανδρος; fl. 4th century BC) was an officer in the service of Alexander the Great. He was one of those called etairoi, but he held the command of a body of mercenaries. He was appointed by Alexander to the government of Lydia, during the settlement of the affairs of Asia made by Alexander when at Tyre (331 BC). Menander appears to have remained at that post until the year 323 BC, when he was commissioned to lead a reinforcement of troops to Alexander at Babylon — he arrived there just before the king's last illness. In the division of the provinces, after the death of Alexander, Menander received his former government of Lydia, of which he was quick to take possession.

He appears soon to have attached himself to the party of Antigonus and was the first to give Antigonus information about the ambitious schemes of Perdiccas for marrying Cleopatra. In the new distribution of the provinces at Triparadisus (321 BC) he lost the government of Lydia, which was given to Cleitus; but this was probably only in order that he might liaise more easily with Antigonus, as illustrated by him commanding a part of Antigonus's army in the first campaign against Eumenes (320 BC). The following year, Menander learnt of the escape of Eumenes from Nora, and advanced with an army into Cappadocia to attack him, forcing him to take refuge in Cilicia. After this, there is no further records about Menander.
