= Nicanor (satrap) =

4th century BCE Macedonian officer, Antigonid governor of Media

Nicanor (/naɪˈkeɪnər/; Greek: Nικάνωρ Nīkā́nōr) was a Macedonian officer of distinction who served as satrap of Media under Antigonus (possibly Nicanor of Stageira, who served under Alexander the Great).

In 321 BCE, at the division of the provinces, after the death of the regent Perdicas, he gained the position of satrap of Cappadocia. He attached himself to the party of Antigonus I Monophthalmus, whom he accompanied in the war against Eumenes. After the Battle of Gabiene, the mutinous Argyraspids agreed to surrender their general into Antigonus's hands; it was Nicanor who was selected to receive the prisoner from them.

After the defeat of Peithon and his associates around 314 BCE, Antigonus appointed Nicanor as satrap of Media and the adjoining provinces, commonly termed the "Upper Satrapies", which he continued to hold until 311 BCE when Seleucus made himself master of Babylon, and started the Babylonian War.

Nicanor now assembled a large force and marched against the invader, but was surprised and defeated by Seleucus at the passage of the river Tigris, and his troops were either cut to pieces or defected to the enemy.

What happened to Nicanor in this battle is uncertain. Diodorus writes that Nicanor escaped the slaughter and escaped to the desert, from where he wrote to Antigonus for assistance. Appian, however, says he was killed in the battle.
