= Philoxenus (general) =

Satrap of Cilicia
- Reign: 321 BC
- Predecessor: Philotas
- Successor: Pleistarchus

Philoxenus (in Greek Φιλόξενος) was a Macedonian officer appointed to superintend the collection of the tribute in the provinces north of the Taurus Mountains after Alexander the Great's return from Egypt in 331 BC. However, he did not immediately assume this command because he was sent forward by Alexander from the field of Gaugamela to take possession of Susa and the treasures there deposited, which he effected without opposition. After this, he seems to have remained quietly in the discharge of his functions in Asia Minor, until the commencement of the year 323, when he brought troops from Caria to Babylon, where he arrived just before the last illness of Alexander. In the distribution of the provinces which followed the death of that monarch, there is no mention of Philoxenus, but in 321 he was appointed by Perdiccas to succeed Philotas in the government of Cilicia. By what means he afterwards conciliated the favour of Antipater is unknown, but in the partition at Triparadisus after the fall of Perdiccas the same year, he was still allowed to retain his satrapy of Cilicia. No information exists beyond then.
