= Tlepolemus (general) =

Tlepolemus (Greek: Τληπόλεμος; lived 4th century BC) was the son of Pythophanes and one of the hetairoi of Alexander the Great, who was joined in the government of the Parthians and Hyrcanii with Amminapes, a Parthian, whom Alexander had appointed satrap of those provinces. At a later period Tlepolemus was appointed by Alexander satrap of Carmania, which he retained on the death of Alexander in 323 BC, and also at the fresh division of the provinces at Triparadisus in 321. In the following years, Tlepolemus joined a coalition formed by governors of Upper Satrapies with the purpose of fighting Peithon, later assisting Eumenes in his war against Antigonus. Tlepolemus commanded 800 horsemen from Carmania in the Battle of Paraitakene, stationed on the right wing.
