= Philotas (satrap) =

Philotas (Greek: Φιλώτας; lived 4th century BC) was a Macedonian officer in the service of Alexander the Great, who commanded one taxis or division of the phalanx during the advance into Sogdiana and India. It seems probable that he is the same person mentioned by Curtius, as one of those rewarded by the king at Babylon (331 BC) for their distinguished services. There is little doubt also, that he is the same to whom the government of Cilicia was assigned in the distribution of the provinces after the death of Alexander, 323 BC. In 321 BC, he was deprived of his government by Perdiccas and replaced by Philoxenus, but it would seem that this was only in order to employ him elsewhere, as we find him still closely attached to the party of Perdiccas, and after the death of the regent united with Alcetas, Attalus, and their partisans, in the contest against Antigonus. He was taken prisoner, together with Attalus, Docimus, and Polemon, in 320 BC, and shared with them their imprisonment, as well as the daring enterprise by which they for a time recovered their liberty, when they took possession of their prison, overpowering their guards. He again fell into the power of Antigonus, in 316 BC.
