= Oxyartes =

Bactrian nobleman

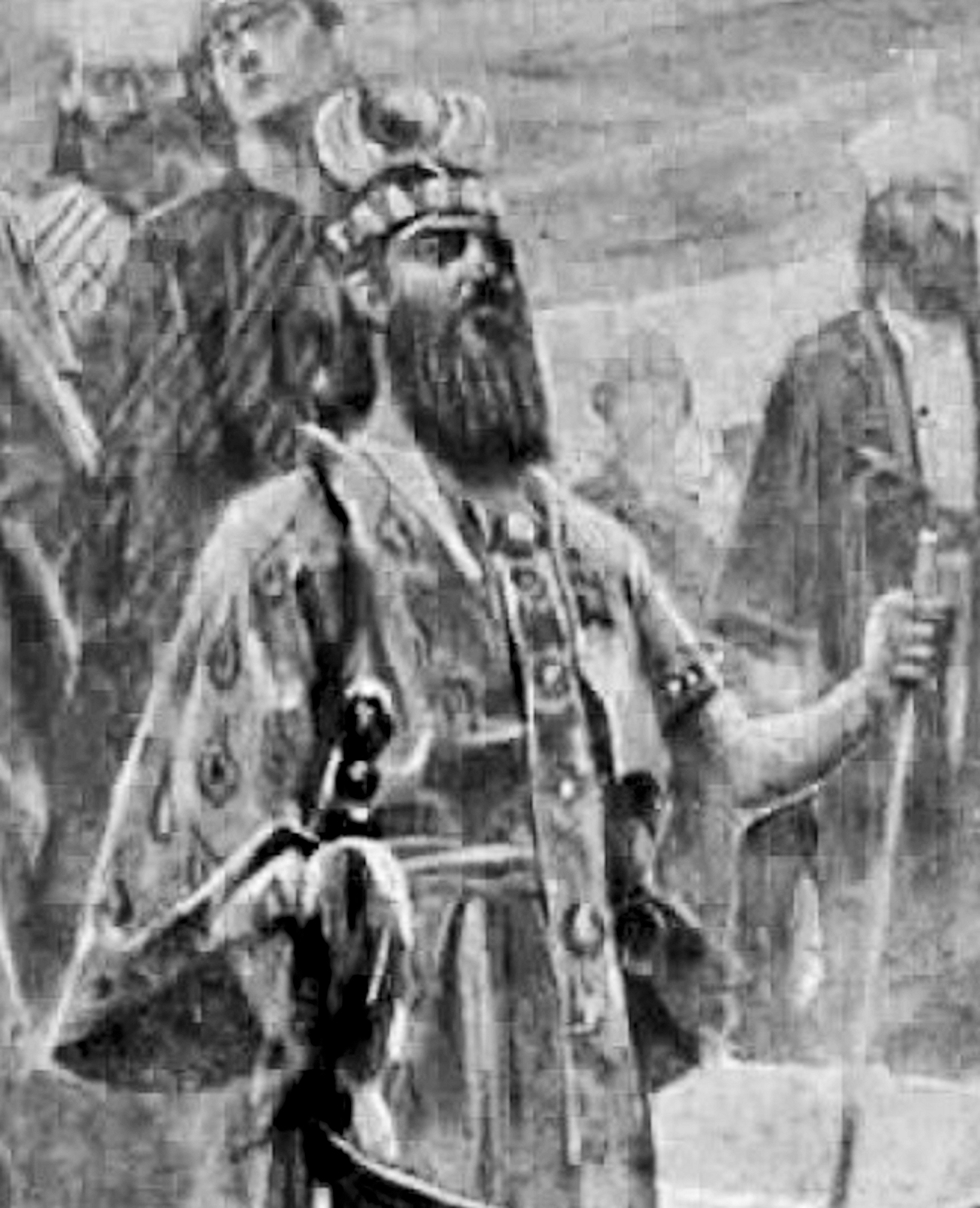
Oxyartes, by René Castaigne, 19th century.

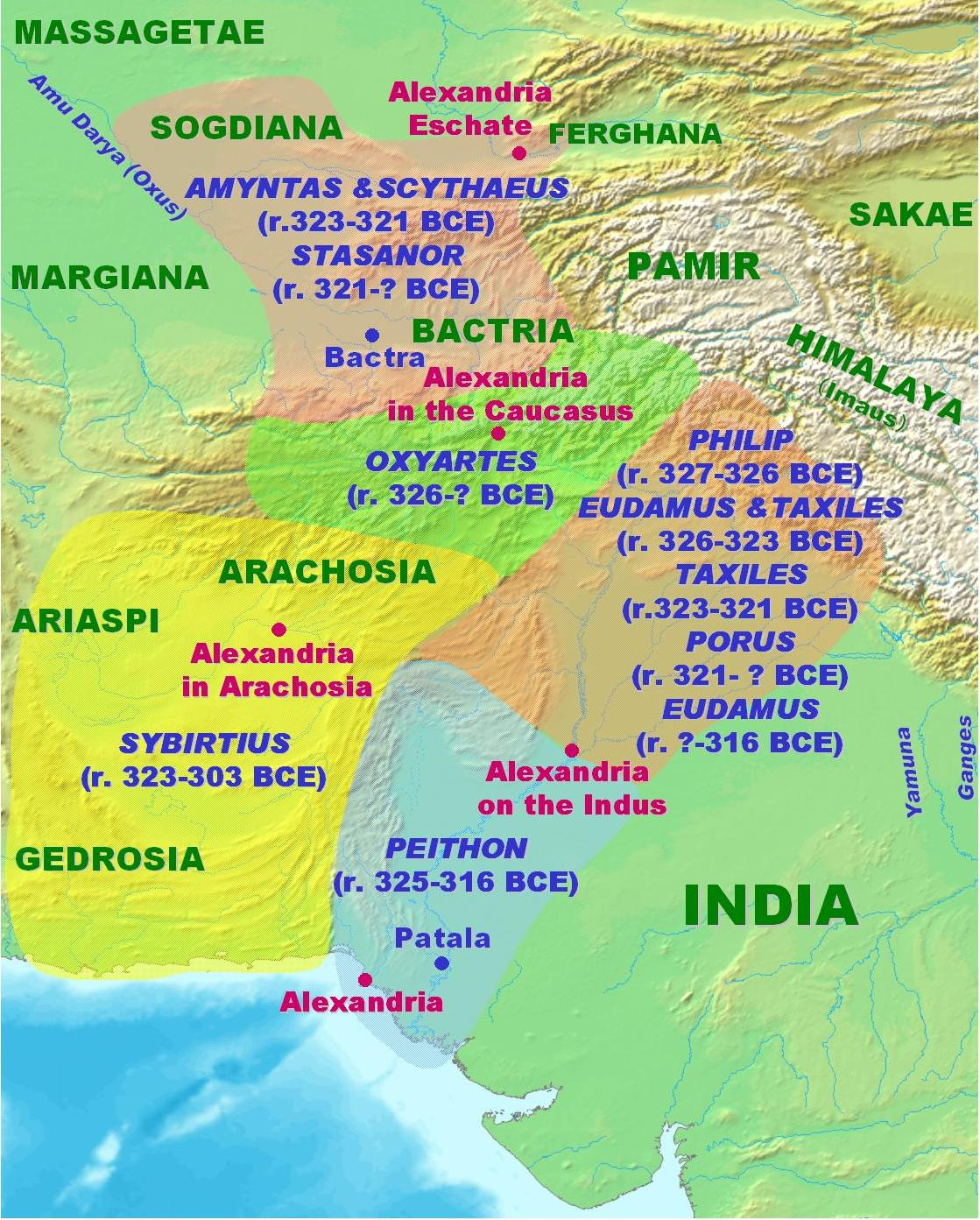
Oxyartes was satrap of the Paropamisus after the death of Alexander.

Oxyartes (Old Persian: 𐎢𐎺𐎧𐏁𐎫𐎼, Greek: Ὀξυάρτης, in Persian: وخش‌ارد ("Vaxš-ard"), from an unattested form in an Old Iranian language: *Huxšaθra-) was a Sogdian or Bactrian nobleman and local ruler of Bactria. His daughter, Roxana, was taken as a wife by Alexander the Great.

He is first mentioned as one of the chiefs who accompanied Bessus on his retreat across the Oxus river into Sogdiana (329 BC). After the death of Bessus, Oxyartes deposited his wife and daughters for safety in a rock fortress in Sogdiana, which was deemed impregnable, but nevertheless soon fell into the hands of Alexander's forces. Alexander not only treated his captives with respect and attention, but was so charmed with the beauty of Roxana as to decide that he wanted to make her his wife. Oxyartes, on learning these tidings, is said to have hastened to make his submission to Alexander, who received him with the utmost distinction. The nuptials of his daughter with the king in 327 BC were celebrated with a magnificent feast. Alexander's marriage to her marks the end of hostilities between him and the inhabitants of Sogdiana and Bactria.

Shortly after this event, Oxyartes successfully persuaded Chorienes to surrender his rock fortress. Subsequently, he was appointed by Alexander as satrap of the province of Paropamisadae. He continued to hold this position until the death of Alexander (323 BC). Oxyartes was confirmed in his position both in the first division of the provinces immediately after Alexander's death, the Partition of Babylon (323 BC), and in the subsequent division decided at Triparadisus in 321 BC.

Later on Oxyartes sent a small force to support Eumenes; but after the death of that general in 316 BC after the Battle of Gabiene, he seems to have come to terms with Antigonus, who was content to take on the role of confirming Oxyartes in his position as he would have found it difficult to dispossess Oxyartes even if he had wanted to.

It seems probable that Oxyartes must have died before Seleucus' foray into India, as Seleucus ceded Paropamisadae to Chandragupta Maurya without any mention of Oxyartes.

== Bibliography ==
- Smith, William (editor); Dictionary of Greek and Roman Biography and Mythology, "Oxyartes (2)", Boston, (1867)
