= Laomedon of Mytilene =

Greek military commander and general of Alexander the Great

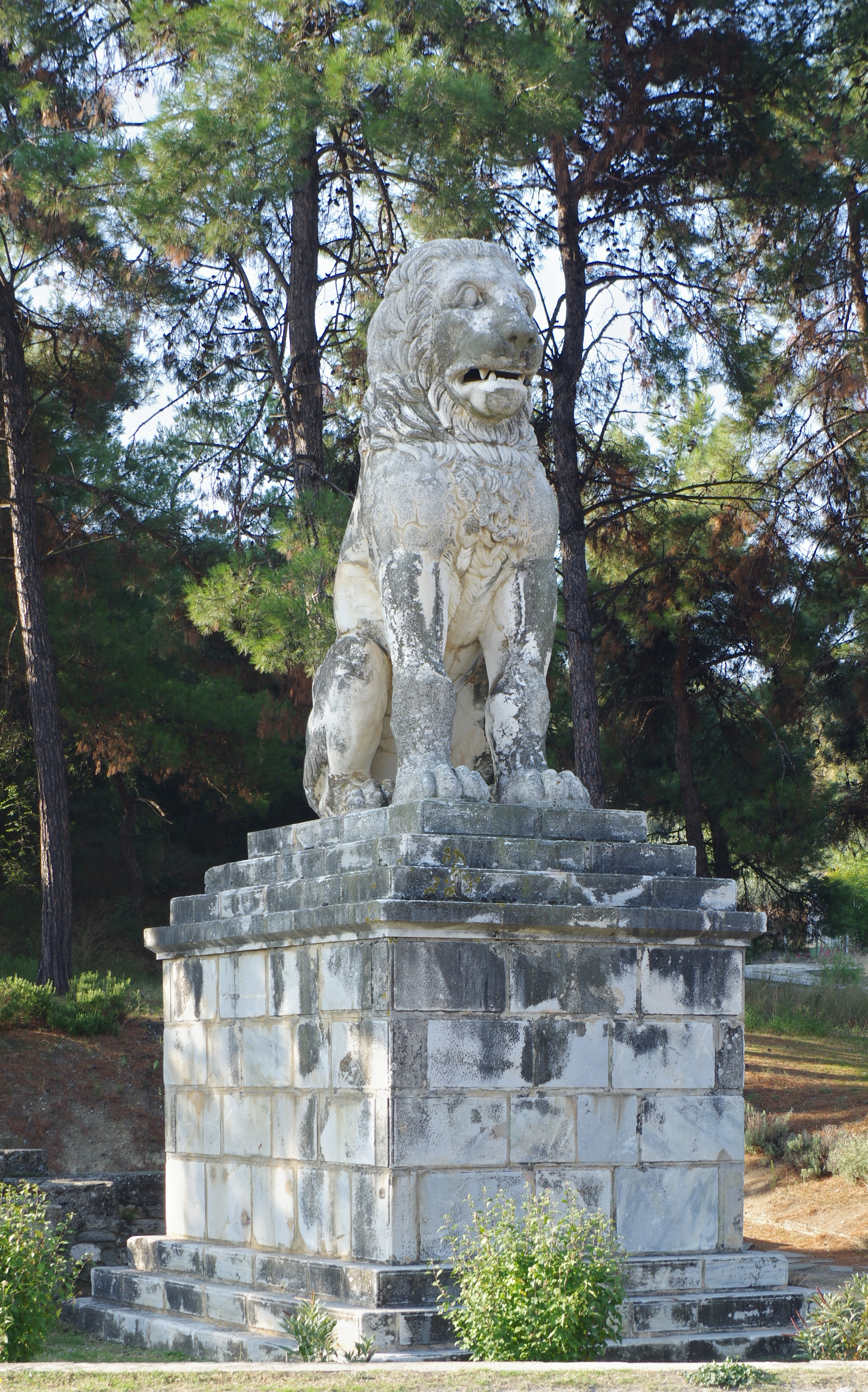
The Lion of Amphipolis

Laomedon (Greek: Λαoμέδων ὁ Μυτιληναῖος; lived during the 4th century BC) was a Greek military commander, native of Mytilene and son of Larichus. He was one of Alexander the Great's generals, and appears to have enjoyed a high place in his confidence even before the death of Philip II, as he was one of those banished by that monarch (together with his brother Erigyius, Ptolemy, Nearchus, and others) for taking part in the intrigues of the young prince.

After the death of Philip in 336 BC, Laomedon, in common with the others who had suffered on this occasion, was held by Alexander in the highest honour: he accompanied him to Asia, where, on account of his acquaintance with the Persian language, he was appointed in charge of the captives. Though his name is not afterwards mentioned during the wars of Alexander, the high consideration he enjoyed is sufficiently attested by his obtaining in the division of the provinces, after the king's death in 323 BC, the important government of Syria.

After the death of Alexander in 323 B.C., the Macedonian Empire was fought over by various of his generals. Judea being situated between Egypt and Syria, became a crossroads in the wars fought between these Diadochi. It was at first governed by Laomedon, the Mitylenian, one of Alexander captains, and after he was defeated by Ptolemy Soter, King of Egypt, the Jews refused to violate their engagement to him.

This he was still allowed to retain on the second partition at Triparadisus in 321 BC, but it was not long before the provinces of Phoenicia and Coele-Syria attracted the interest of his powerful neighbour Ptolemy. The Egyptian king at first offered Laomedon a large sum of money in exchange for his government. When the latter rejected his overtures, he sent Nicanor with an army to invade Syria.

Laomedon was unable to offer any effective resistance. He was made prisoner by Nicanor and sent to Egypt. However, he managed to escape and joined Alcetas in Pisidia. It is probable that Laomedon took part in the subsequent contest involving Alcetas, Attalus, and the other surviving partisans of Perdiccas against Antigonus, and shared in their final overthrow by Antigonus in 320 BC, but his individual fate is not mentioned.

== See also ==
- Lion of Amphipolis, erected in honour of Laomedon
