= Sibyrtius =

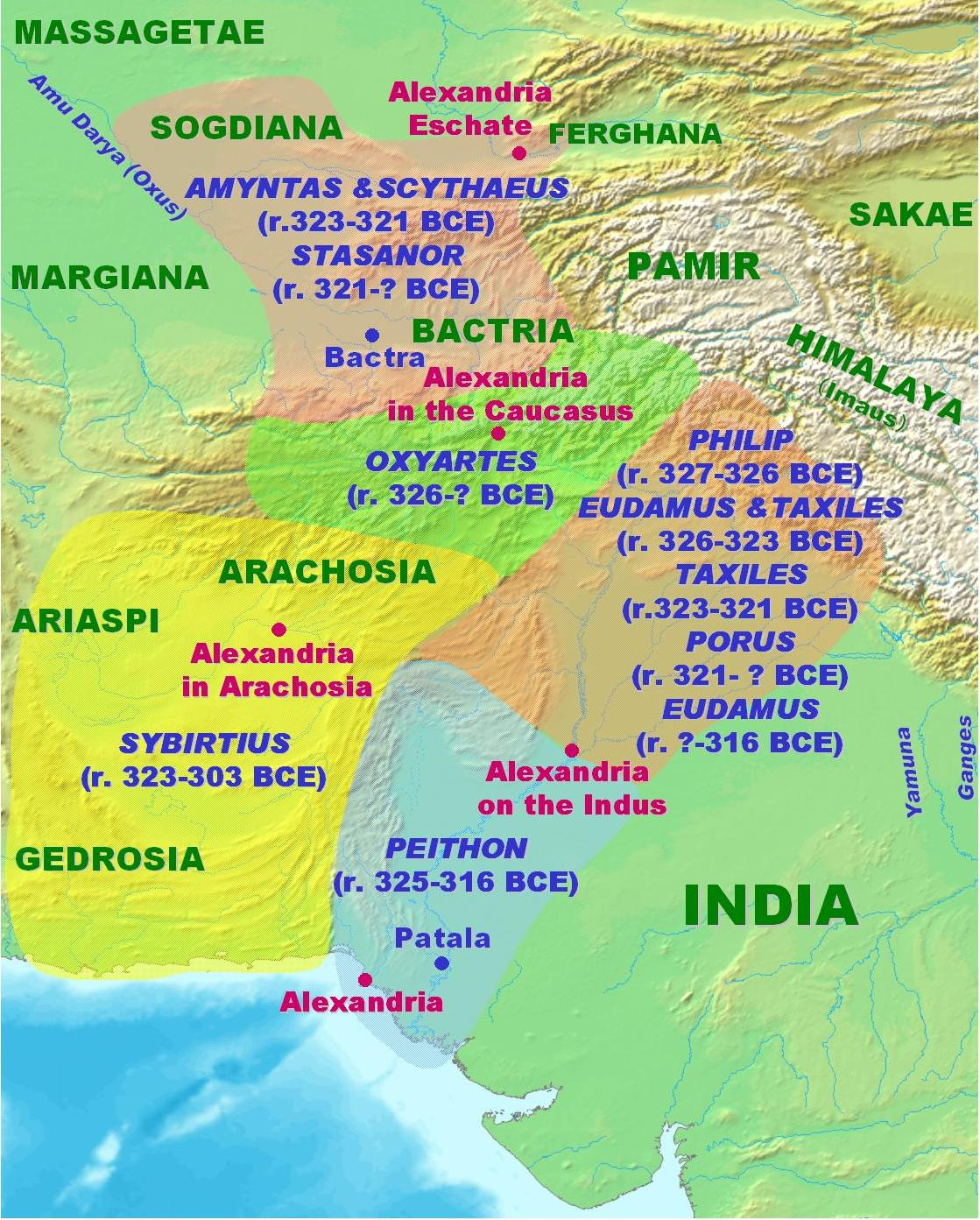
Sibyrtius was satrap of Arachosia and Gedrosia after the death of Alexander.

Sibyrtius (Ancient Greek: Σιβύρτιος Sivyrtios; lived 4th century BC) was a Greek officer from Crete in the service of Alexander the Great, who was the satrap of Arachosia and Gedrosia shortly after the death of Alexander until about 303 BC.

After serving in Alexander's army for a number of years, Sibyrtius was appointed by Alexander, on his return from India (326 BCE), governor of the province of Carmania. Shortly after, Sibyrtius exchanged this post for the more important satrapy of Arachosia and Gedrosia, to which he succeeded on the death of Thoas (Θόας).

Following the death of Alexander in 323, Sibyrtius, in common with most of the other governors of the remote eastern provinces, retained possession of his satrapy, which was again confirmed to him in the second partition at Triparadisus in 321.

In the subsequent divisions involving the eastern satraps, Sibyrtius was one of those who supported Peucestas against Peithon and Seleucus, and afterwards accompanied Peucestas when he joined Eumenes in Susiana in 317. His attachment was to Peucestas and not to Eumenes, and in Peucestas' subsequent intrigues against his commander-in-chief, Sibyrtius supported him so strongly that he incurred Eumenes' strong resentment, who threatened to bring him to trial; a fate from which he only escaped by a hasty flight.

Sibyrtius' open rupture with Eumenes had the advantage of securing him the favour of Antigonus, who, after the defeat of his rival, confirmed Sibyrtius in his satrapy, and placed under his command a large part of the select body of troops termed Argyraspids. Antigonus adopted this measure with the ostensible object of guarding the Eastern provinces against the neighbouring Indians, but according to Diodorus Siculus, Antigonus no longer wished to have this group of troops in his domain at all; their turbulent and disaffected spirit was well known.

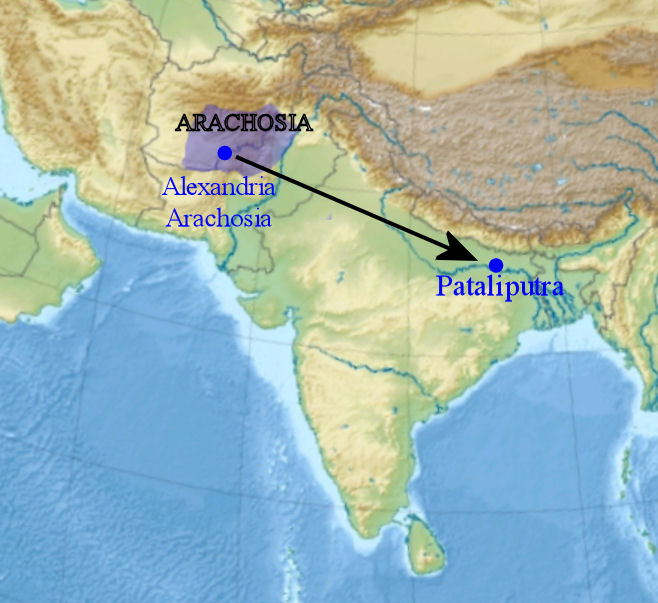
According to Arrian, Megasthenes lived in Arachosia at the court of Sibyrtius, and travelled as an ambassador to the court of Chandragupta Maurya in Pataliputra.

Arrian mentions that Megasthenes, the historian and ambassador of Seleucus to the court of Chandragupta, lived with Sibyrtius, suggesting the latter may have remained at his post as satrap for quite a long time:

Megasthenes lived with Sibyrtius, satrap of Arachosia, and often speaks of his visiting Sandracottus, the king of the Indians.
