= Philip (satrap) =

- Φίλιππος

Satrap of Parthia
- In office 321 BC – 318 BC
- Monarch: Alexander IV
- Succeeded by: Eudemus

Satrap of Sogdiana
- In office 327 BC – 321 BC
- Monarchs: Alexander III (until 323 BC); Alexander IV (from 323 BC)

Personal details
- Born: Unknown
- Died: 318 BC
- Cause of death: Execution
- Occupation: Satrap

Military service
- Allegiance: Macedonia
- Battles/wars: Wars of Alexander the Great; Wars of the Diadochi

Philip (Ancient Greek: Φίλιππος; died 318 BC) was satrap of Sogdiana. He was first appointed to this position by Alexander the Great in 327 BC. He retained his post, as did most of the satraps of the more remote provinces, in the arrangements which followed the death of the king in 323 BC; but in the subsequent partition at Triparadisus in 321 BC, he was assigned the government of Parthia instead. Here he remained until 318 BC, when Peithon, who was then seeking to establish his power over all the provinces of the East, put Philip to death and appointed his brother Eudemus as satrap of Parthia.
