= Archon of Pella =

4th-century BC Macedonian general

Archon (Ancient Greek: Ἄρχων; died 321 BC) was a Pellaeon, appointed satrap of Babylonia after the death of Alexander the Great in 323 BC. He is probably the same as the son of Cleinias mentioned in the Indian expedition of Alexander. He perished in 321 BC in a fight against Dokimos. An inscription in Delphi shows that Archon had taken part in both the Isthmian and Pythian Games of 333 to 332 BC, won some horse-races.

== 1938 statue base discovery ==
A limestone statue base was found on 2 May 1938 in Delphi along the Via Sacra. It is currently held by the Delphi Archaeological Museum. Three different inscriptions in Greek were engraved on the base. The first six-line epigram celebrated Archon's athletic victories, his administration of the city of Babylon, a period of military service alongside Alexander, the glory given to his motherland (Pella) by his achievements, followed by the dedication of a sculptural group depicting Archon's family. A shorter inscription of two elegiac couplets related to Archon’s victories in the Pythian and Isthmic agons in an equestrian event. The third inscription was a decree granting privileges to Archon and his family (including priority in consulting the oracles, first place in the theater, exemption from taxes, and precedence in the tribunal). Smaller inscriptions on the statue base found in the same area named, Archon's father, Kleinos, his mother, Synesis (wife of Kleinos), and his brother, Isokrates.

The dating of these inscriptions confirm that the Archon referred to was, known from the historiography as the officer of Alexander the Great, who was active in the East between 326 and 321 BC. Together with other Trierarchs, Alexander assigned Archon to oversee the transport of the fleet in the Battle of the Hydaspes of 326. During the division of the empire among the generals after the death of Alexander, Archon assumed the satrapy of Babylon. In the Wars of the Diadochi, Archon was hostile to Perdiccas, who sent Dokimos to Babylon against him. Archon then died in 321 in the battle for control of the city.

== Sources ==
- Heckel, Waldemar. Who's Who in the Age of Alexander the Great (P. J. Rhodes, R. Osborne: Greek Historical Inscriptions 404–323 BC.)
- Smith, William (editor); Dictionary of Greek and Roman Biography and Mythology, "Archon (1)", Boston, (1867)
- Epigraphical Database
- University of Naples Federico II. Archon di Pella vince gli Isthmia e ai Pythia.
- Matz, David. Greek and Roman Sport. McFarland, 1991.
