= Leonnatus =

Macedonian officer

Leonnatus (Greek: Λεοννάτος; 356 BC – 322 BC) was a Macedonian officer of Alexander the Great and one of the diadochi.

== Early life and background ==
Leonnatus was a member of the royal house of Lyncestis, a small Greek kingdom that had been included in Macedonia by King Philip II of Macedon. The Suda records that Leonnatus was related to Eurydice I, mother of Philip II of Macedon.

== Career ==
=== Service under Philip II and under Alexander the Great ===
Leonnatus served under Philip II as one of his bodyguards, or somatophylakes. Shortly after Philip II was assassinated by Pausanias, Leonnatus helped kill Pausanias while he attempted to flee. Leonnatus was the same age as Alexander and was very close to him. Later, he was one of Alexander's seven bodyguards.

=== After Alexander's death ===
After Alexander died in 323 BC, the regent, Perdiccas, made Leonnatus satrap of Hellespontine Phrygia.

Diodorus (Book XVII.37-38) tells us that during the Battle of Issus, the immediate family of Darius had been captured by the Macedonian Army. Darius' family was hysterical that they would suffer a dreadful fate. However, Leonnatus was able to explain to them, on behalf of Alexander, that this would not be the case. In fact, Alexander promised to respect them as royalty, increase their household servants and to raise Darius' 6-year-old boy as his own.

Leonnatus crushed the rebellion of Oritians in India, while losing only a few men.

Alexander's sister Cleopatra, the widow of King Alexander I of Epirus, offered her hand to Leonnatus. When the Athenians heard that Alexander had died, they revolted against Macedonia and the new regent, Antipater. Leonnatus led an army of 20,000 infantry with 1,500 cavalry to relieve Antipater during the siege in Lamia (see Lamian War). He intervened probably with the ambition to usurp Antipater's power. A victory in battle against the Athenians would have certainly enhanced his claim to the throne. Leonnatus was killed in battle against the Athenians and his marriage with Cleopatra never took place.
