= Paropamisadae =

Alexandrian satrapy in Afghanistan and Pakistan

Paropamisadae or Parapamisadae (Ancient Greek: Παροπαμισάδαι or Παροπανισάδαι) was a satrapy of the Alexandrian Empire in modern Afghanistan and Pakistan, which largely coincided with the Achaemenid province of Parupraesanna. It consisted of the districts of Sattagydia (Bannu basin), Gandhara (Kabul, Peshawar, and Taxila), and Oddiyana (Swat Valley). Paruparaesanna is mentioned in the Akkadian language and Elamite language versions of the Behistun Inscription of Darius the Great, whereas in the Old Persian version it is called Gandāra. The entire satrapy was subsequently ceded by Seleucus I Nicator to Chandragupta Maurya after Mauryan Victory in Selucid-Mauryan war following a treaty.

== Name ==
Paropamisadae is the Latinized form of the Greek name Paropamisádai (Παροπαμισάδαι), which is in turn derived from Old Persian Para-uparisaina, meaning "Beyond the Hindu Kush", where the Hindu Kush is referred to as Uparisaina ("higher than the eagle").

In the Greek language and Latin, "Paropamisus" (Παροπαμισός, Paropamisós) came to mean the Hindu Kush. In many Greek and Latin sources, particularly editions of Ptolemy's Geography where their realm is included on the 9th Map of Asia, the names of the people and region are given as Paropanisadae and Paropanisus. They also appeared less frequently as Parapamisadae and Parapamīsus (Παραπάμισος, Parapámisos), Paropamīsii, etc.

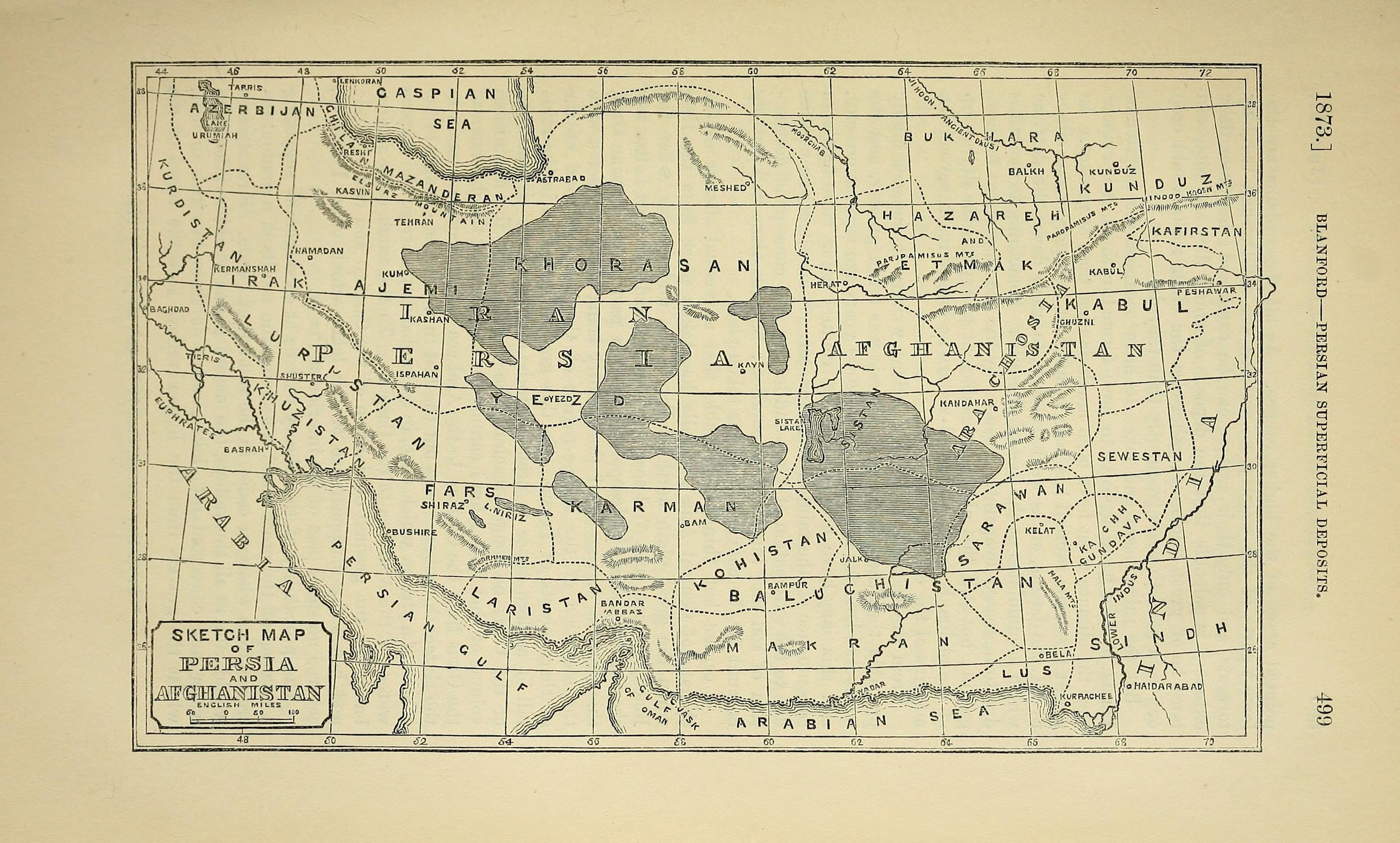
Note the wider conception of what is today Paropamisus Mts. Here it is the whole northern side of the extensions of Hindu kush, map from 1873

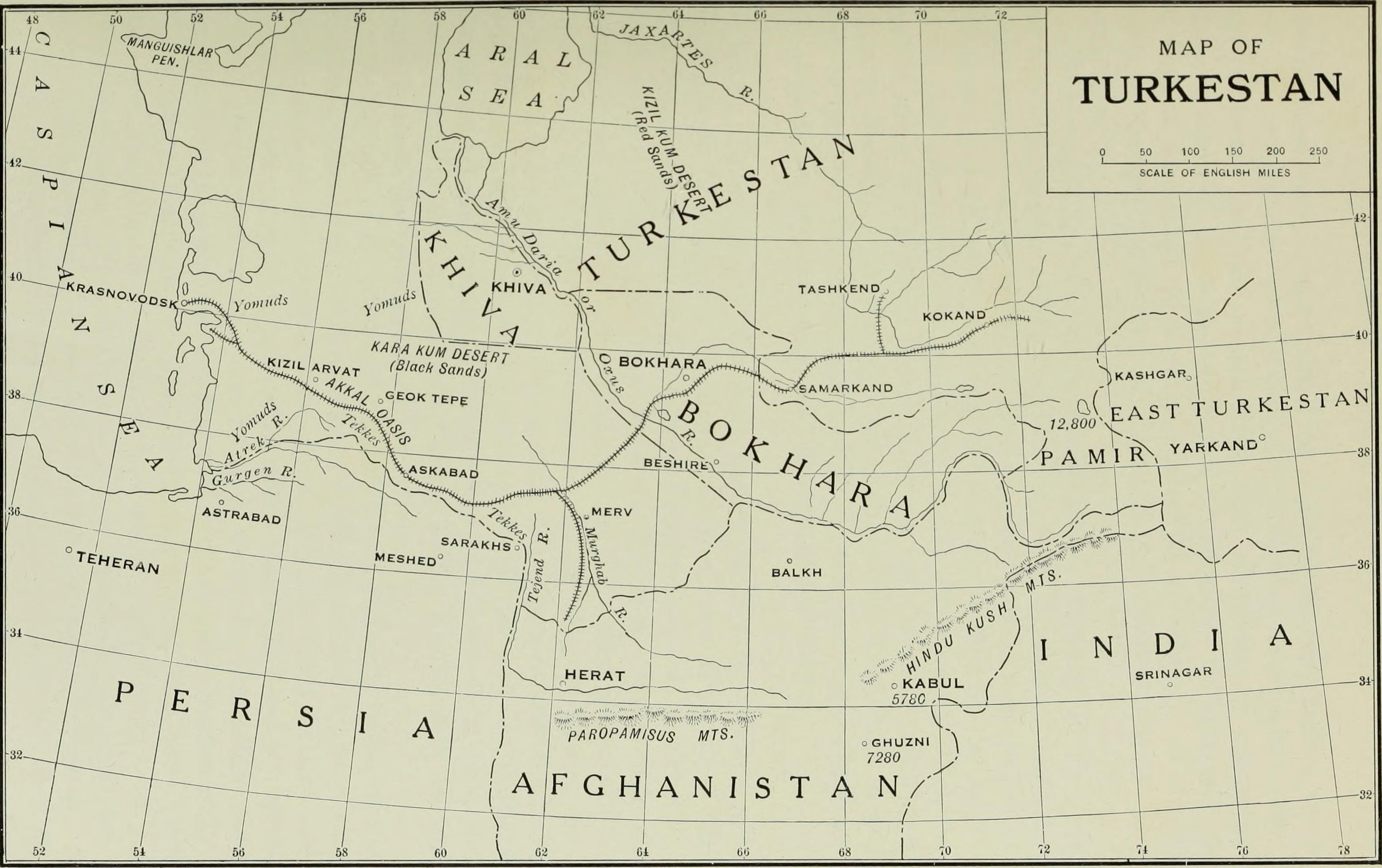
Note the probably wrong position of what is today the Paropamisus. Here it is on the south side of Hari river, map from 1922

The name was also applied to a nearby river, probably the Obi river. The mountain range Selseleh-ye Safīd Kūh is also called Paropamisus or Paropamisus Mountains.

== Geography and peoples ==
The provinces of the Achaemenid Empire

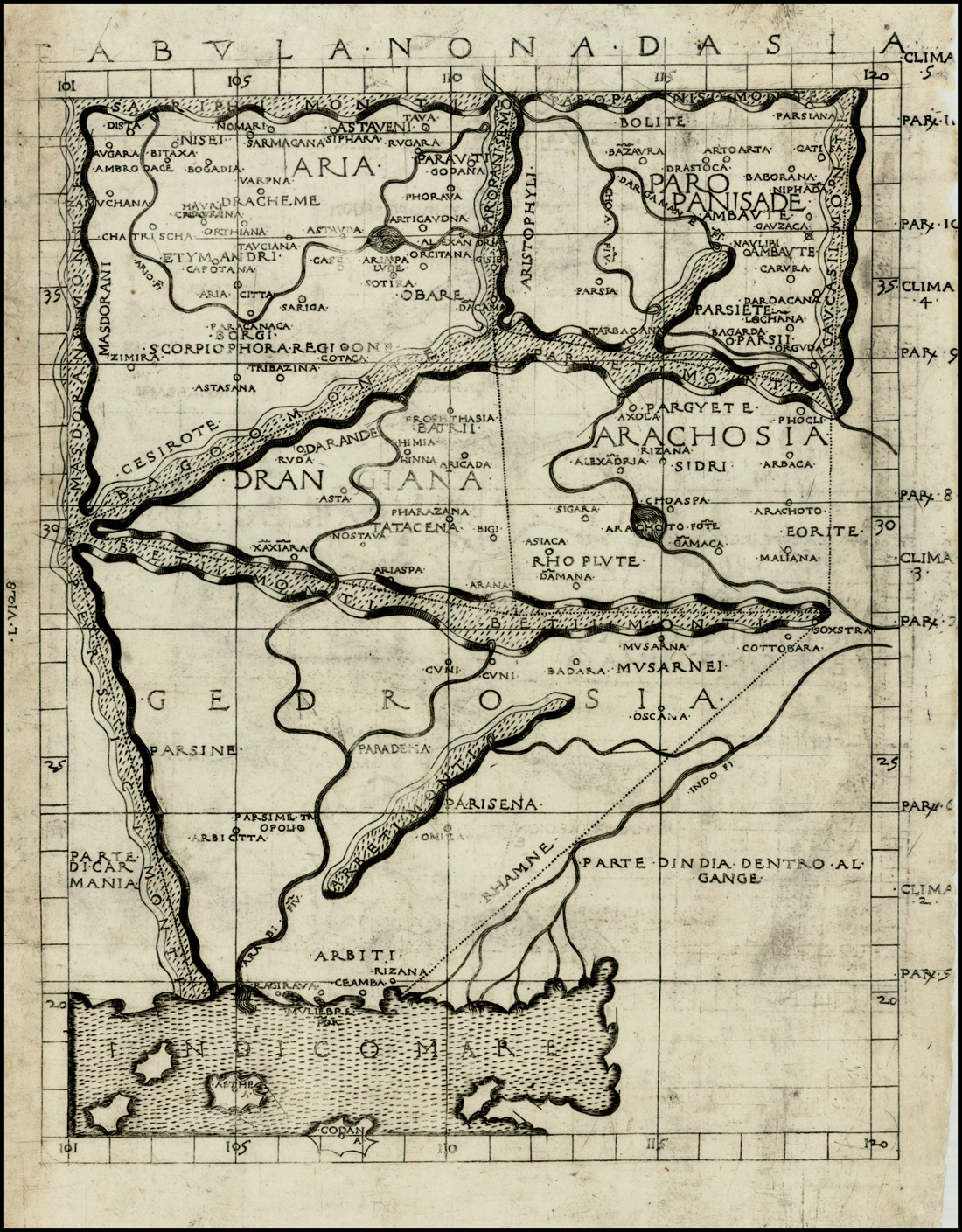
Map from Francesco Berlinghieri's 1482 Seven Days of Geography.

Strabo describes the region as follows:

The geographical position of the tribes is as follows: along the Indus are the Paropamisadae, above whom lies the Paropamisus mountain; then, towards the south, the Arachoti; then next, towards the south, the Gedroseni, with the other tribes that occupy the seaboard; and the Indus lies, latitudinally, alongside these places; and of these places, in part, some that lie along the Indus are held by Indians, although they formerly belonged to the Persians. Alexander took these away from the Arians and established settlements of his own, but Seleucus I Nicator gave them to Sandrocottus, upon terms of intermarriage and of receiving in exchange 500 elephants.

Alongside the Paropamisadae, on the west, are situated the Arii, and alongside the Arachoti and Gedrosii the Drangae; but the Arii are situated alongside the Drangae on the north as well as on the west, almost surrounding a small part of their country.

Thus the region was north of Arachosia, stretching up to the Hindu Kush and Pamir mountains, and bounded in the east by the Indus River. It mainly included the Kabul region, Gandhara and the northern regions such as Swat and Chitral.

The nations who composed the Paropamisadae are recorded as the Cabolitae (Καβολῖται) in the north near modern Kabul; the Parsii (Πάρσιοι) in the northwest, the Ambautae (Ἀμβαῦται) in the east and the Par(g)yetae (Παρ(γ)υῆται) in the south, who were also found in Arachosia. The major cities of the land were the city of Ortospana (Ὀρτοσπάνα) or Carura (Κάρουρα), probably identifiable with Kabul, Gauzaca (Γαύζακα), probably modern Ghazni, Capissa (Καπίσσα), modern-day Kapisa, and Parsia (Παρσία), the capital of the Parsii.

== History ==
In the ancient Buddhist texts, the mahajanapada kingdom of Kamboja compassed the territories of Paropamisus and extended to the southwest of Kashmir as far as Rajauri. The region came under Achaemenid Persian control in the late 6th century BC, either during the reign of Cyrus the Great or Darius I.

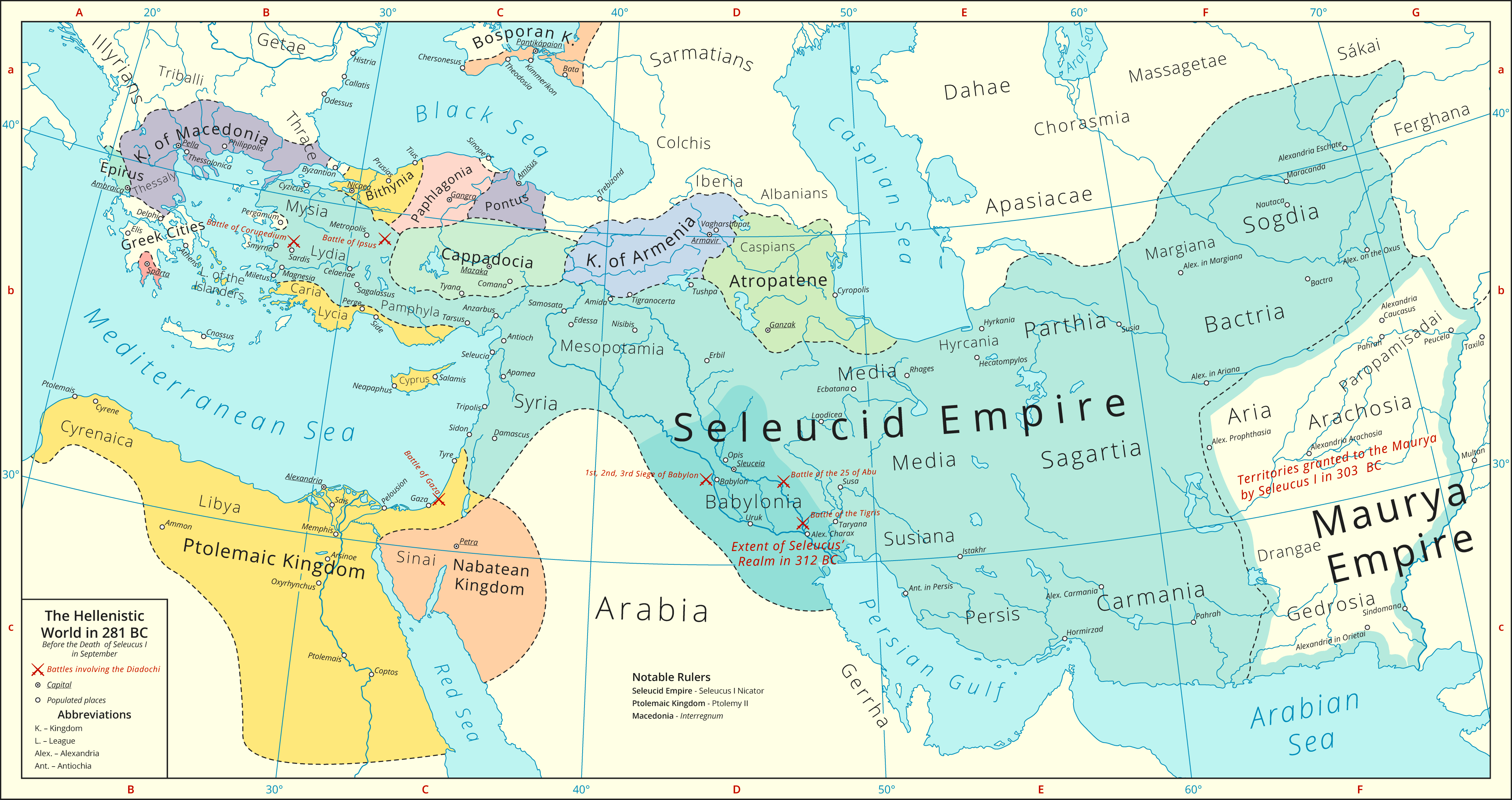
The Hellenistic World in late 281 BC

In the 320s BC, Alexander the Great conquered the entire Achaemenid Empire, beginning the Hellenistic period. The Greek name Παροπαμισάδαι or Παροπαμισσός was used extensively in Greek literature to describe the conquests of Alexander and those of the kings of the Greco-Bactrian Kingdom and the Indo-Greek Kingdom, from the 3rd to the 1st centuries BC.

After Alexander's death in 323 BC, the area came under control of the Seleucid Empire, which gave the region to the Mauryan Dynasty of India in 305 BC. After the fall of the Mauryans in 185 BC, the Greco-Bactrians under King Demetrius I annexed the northwestern regions of the former Mauryan Empire, including Paropamisus, and it became part of his Euthydemid Indo-Greek Kingdom. The Eucratidians seized the area soon after the death of Menander I, but lost it to the Yuezhi around 125 BC.

Gandharan Achaemenid soldier

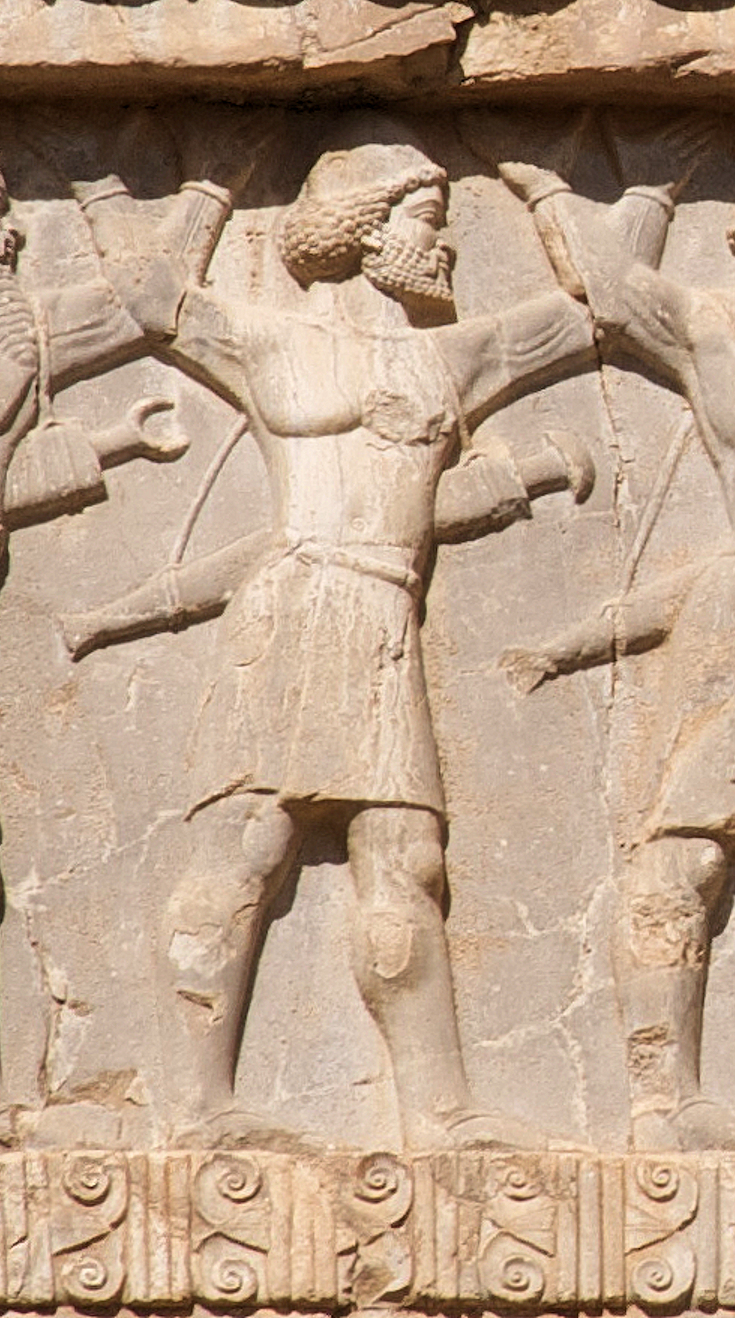
Xerxes I tomb, Gandharan soldier of the Achaemenid army, circa 480 BCE.

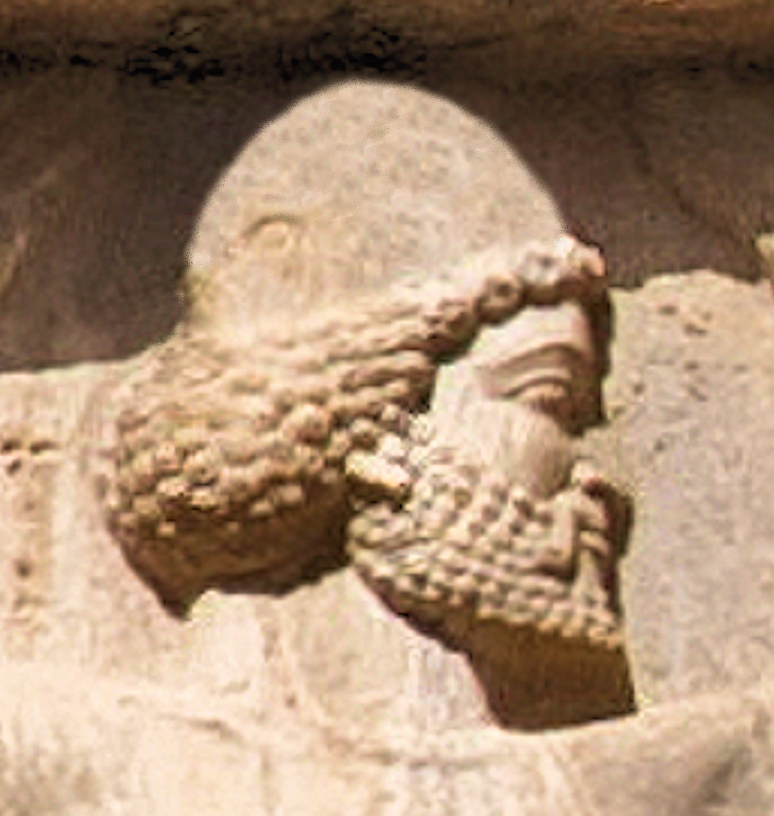
Xerxes I tomb, Gandharan soldier circa 480 BCE (enhanced detail).

Sattagydian Achaemenid soldier

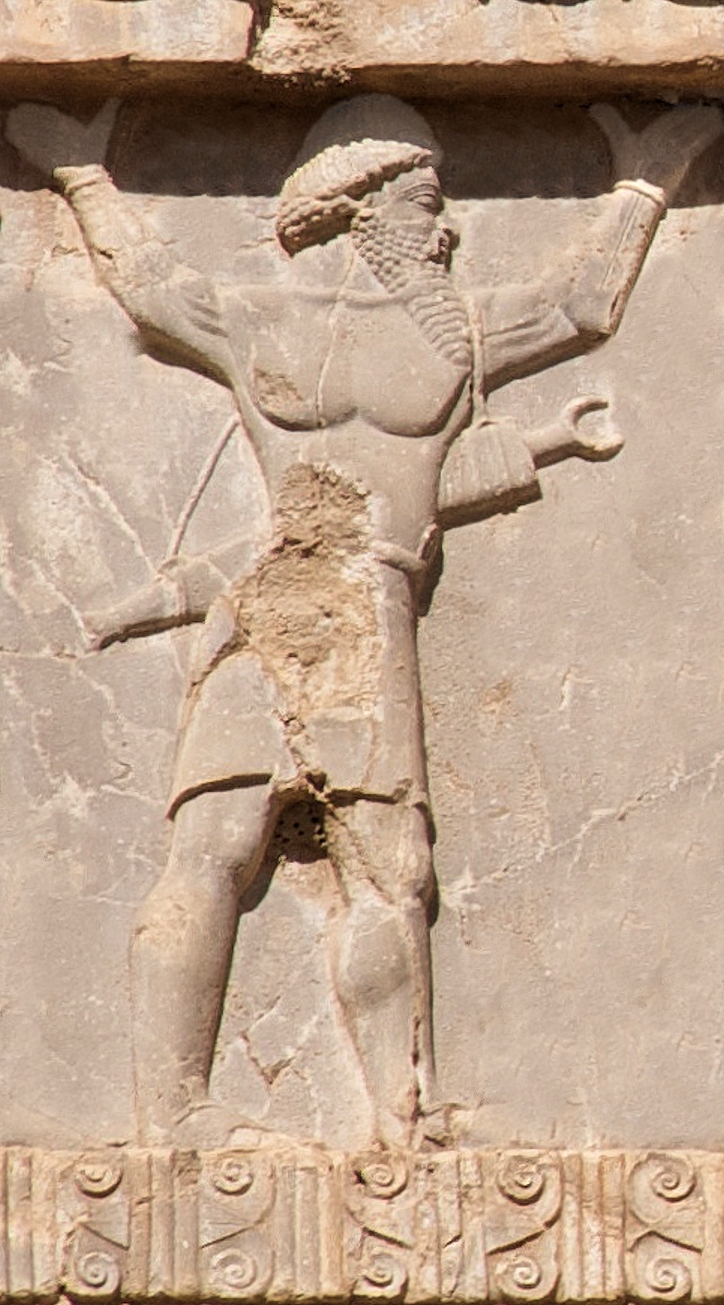
Xerxes I tomb, Sattagydian soldier of the Achaemenid army, circa 480 BCE.

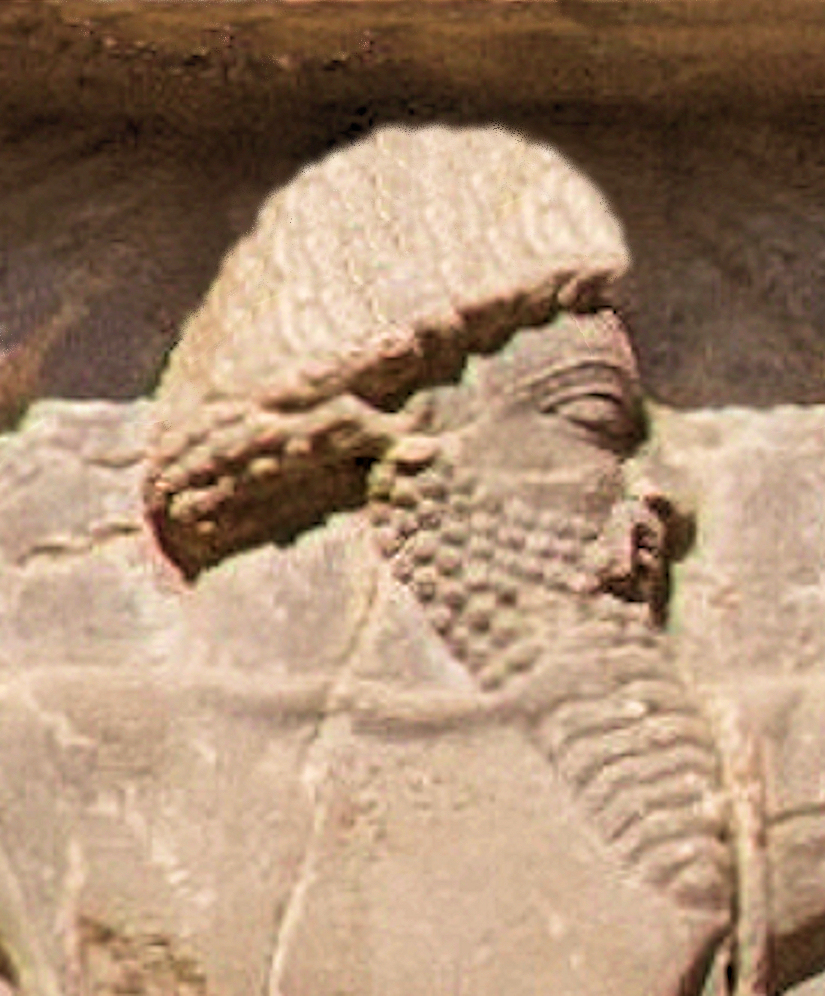
Xerxes I tomb, Sattagydian soldier circa 480 BCE (enhanced detail).

== See also ==
- Indo-Greek kingdom
- Greco-Bactrian kingdom
