= Pharnabazus III =

4th-century BC Persian satrap of Hellespontine Phrygia

Pharnabazus III Farnabāzu

Satrap of Hellespontine Phrygia
- Reign: c. 334 BC
- Predecessor: Artabazos II
- Successor: Arsites
- Born: c. 370 BC
- Died: after 320 BC
- Father: Artabazos II

Pharnabazus III (Old Iranian: Farnabāzu, Ancient Greek: Φαρνάβαζος; c. 370 BC - after 320 BC) was a Persian satrap who fought against Alexander the Great. His father was Artabazos II, and his mother a Greek from Rhodes.

== Youth in Macedonia ==
Pharnabazus was the son of Artabazos II, satrap of Hellespontine Phrygia. However, Artabazos II was exiled after a failed rebellion against Artaxerxes III in 358 BC. From 352 to 342 BC, the family went into exile to Macedonia, in the capital of Pella, under the rule of king Philip II (360-336 BC), where they met the young Prince Alexander, future Alexander the Great. With Artabazos II and Pharnabazus was Memnon of Rhodes, a Greek mercenary and relative by marriage.

Artabazus, Pharnabazus and Memnon were later allowed to return to Persia, in 343 BC. Memnon obtained the command of the Persian navy in the Aegean sea in 334 BC, with Pharnabazus joining him.

== War against Alexander ==
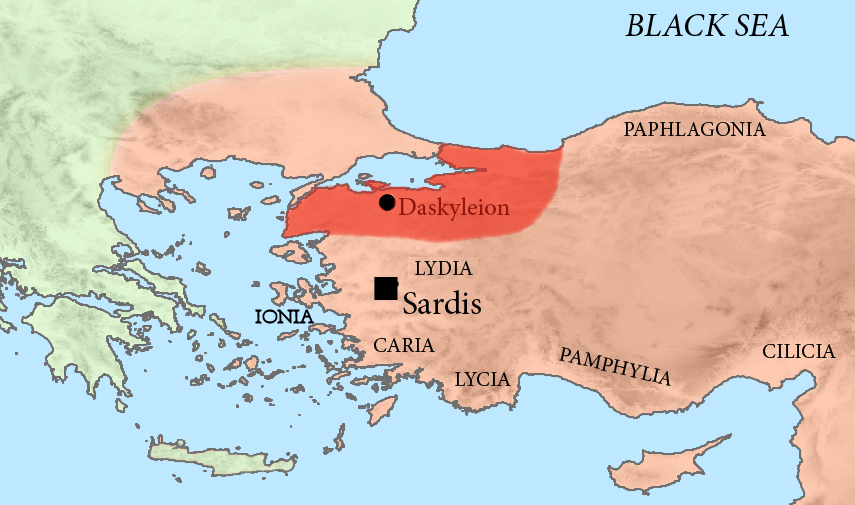
Location of Hellespontine Phrygia, and the provincial capital of Dascylium, in the Achaemenid Empire.

When Alexander invaded the Persian empire, Memnon defended the strategically important town of Halicarnassus, which Alexander was then diverted to capture, forcing him to seek reinforcements. This gave the Persians time to regroup, until Halicarnassus fell in the first months of 333 BC.

Memnon and Pharnabazus then directed their strategy to disrupt Alexander's supply lines by taking Aegean islands near the Hellespont and by fomenting rebellion in southern Greece. Memnon and Pharnabazus had a navy of about 300 warships, composed of Phoenician, Egyptian and Cypriot units, as well as thousands of Greek mercenaries and vast amounts of silver and gold.

=== Support of the Spartan king Agis III against Alexander ===
At around the same time, the Spartan king Agis III and the Athenian statesman Demosthenes organised forces to liberate their cities from the Macedonians. In the autumn of 333 BC, the Spartan King Agis III had met with the Persian commanders Pharnabazus and Autophradates, somewhere in the Aegean Sea, and revealed to them his plans for a war against Alexander—in Greece itself. The Persians agreed to support Agis; however, they could only spare him 30 talents and 10 ships. Agis also recruited the Greek mercenary survivors of Issus - who had served in the Persian army – a force of 8,000 veterans.

Memnon and Pharnabazus took Cos and Chios, but during the siege of Mytilene, the capital of Lesbos, Memnon died of a fever. Pharnabazus took control of the Persian forces in the Aegean, assisted by Autophradates. They captured Mytilene and the isle of Tenedos, which gave him control over the Hellespont.

Pharnabazus further threatened Alexander's supplies by establishing a fortified position near Halicarnassus, which made the harbour inaccessible. He also took Samothrace, Siphnos and Andros and seized all Greek supply ships.

However, after the Persian king Darius III lost the decisive Battle of Issus in November 333 BC, Pharnabazus became increasingly isolated. The Spartan king, Agis III, whilst still receiving ten ships and thirty talents of silver from the Achaemenids, withdrew from outright rebellion. Pharnabazus had to deal with rebellions in his conquered territory and many of his troops deserted him. His much reduced navy was defeated near Chios and Pharnabazus was captured. While being taken to Alexander, he managed to escape and went to Cos.

== Later life ==
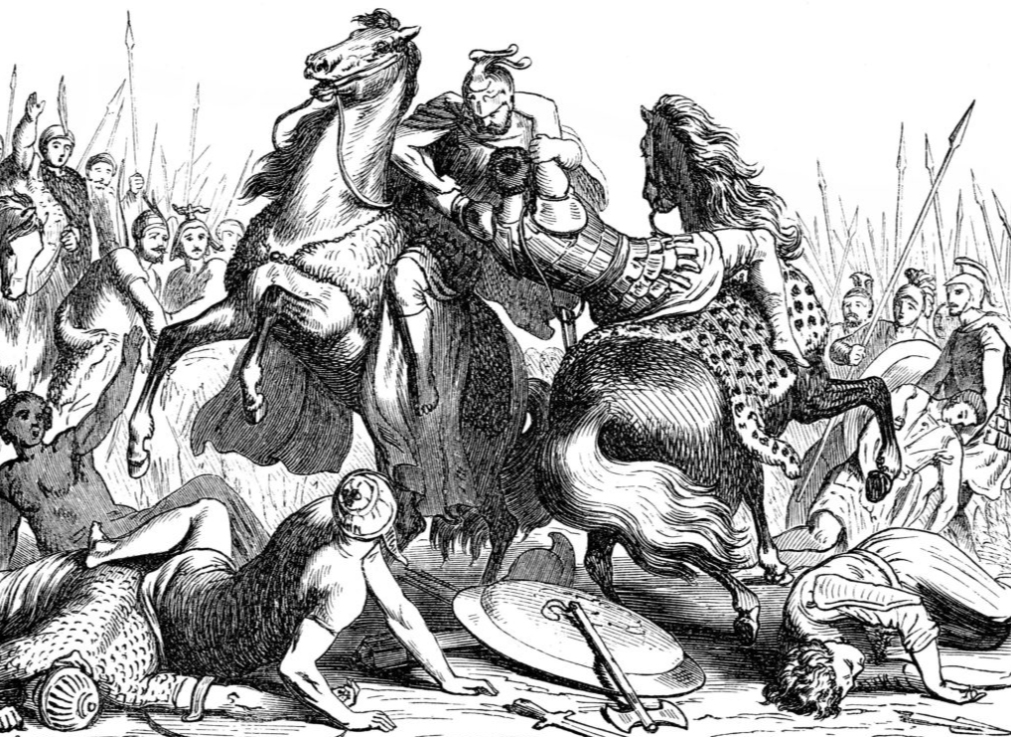
In 321 BC, Pharnabazus commanded a squadron of cavalry for Eumenes, when the latter defeated Neoptolemus in the Wars of the Diadochi. 1878 engraving.

What happened after his escape is not known. There is a gap in the records. It is assumed that he eventually submitted to Alexander, since in 324 BC, Artonis, the sister of Pharnabazus, was given in marriage to Eumenes by Alexander the Great.

"For Barsine, the daughter of Artabazus, who was the first lady Alexander took to his bed in Asia, and who brought him a son named Heracles, had two sisters; one of which, called Apame, he gave to Ptolemy; and the other, called Artonis, he gave to Eumenes, at the time when he was selecting Persian ladies as wives for his friends."

— Plutarch, The Life of Eumenes.

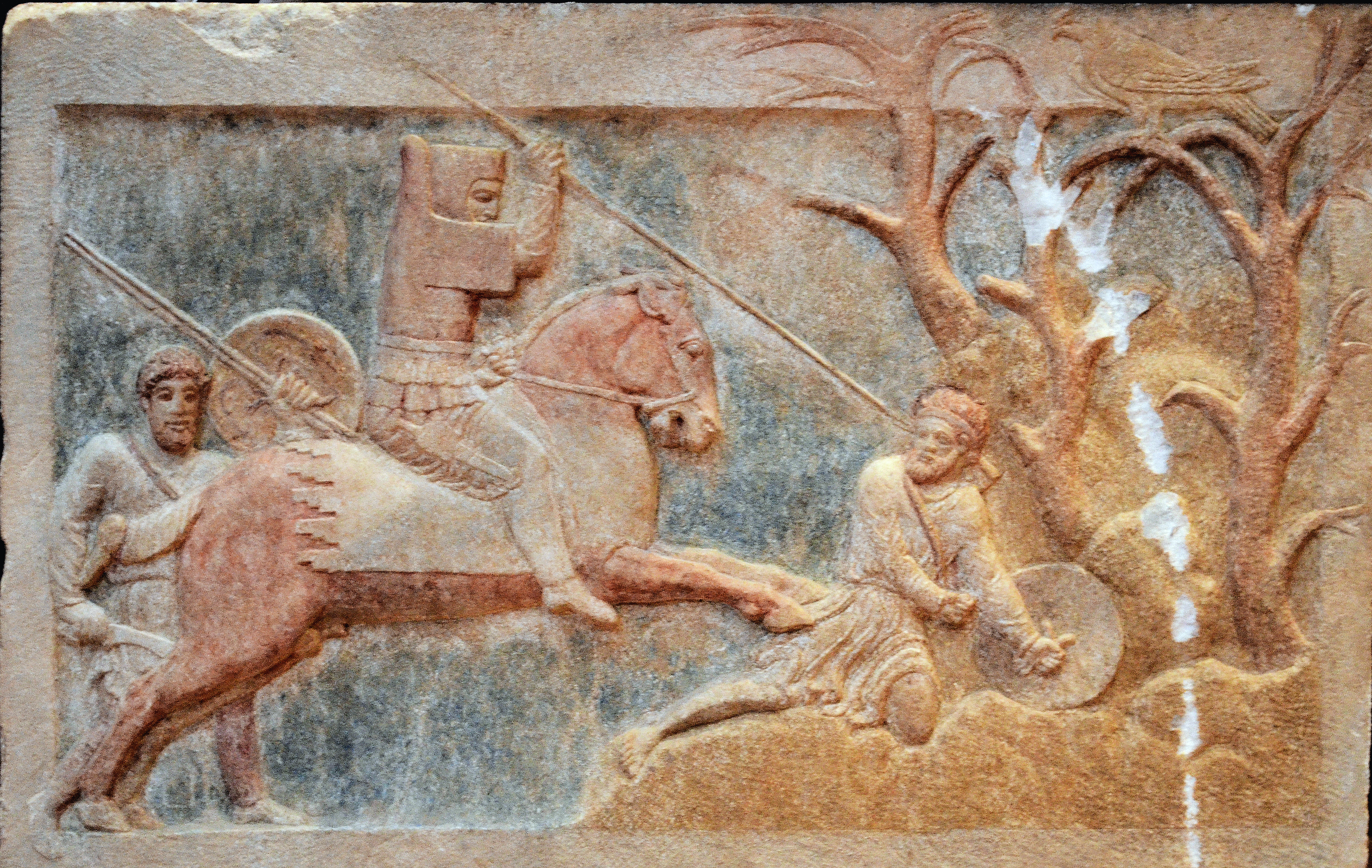
Persian cavalry from Asia Minor under Pharnabazus composed the superior cavalry of Eumenes in the Battle of the Hellespont (321 BC). Altıkulaç Sarcophagus

In 321 BC, in the Battle of the Hellespont, we find Pharnabazus commanding a squadron of cavalry for Eumenes against the Macedonian generals Craterus and Neoptolemus. Eumenes won the battle, while Neoptolemus was killed, and Craterus died of his wounds.

"When he came to give battle, he would not set any Macedonian to engage Craterus, but appointed to that charge two bodies of foreign horse, commanded by Pharnabazus the son of Artabazus, and Phoenix of Tenedos. They had orders to advance on the first sight of the enemy, and come to close fighting without giving them time to retire; and if they attempted to speak or send any herald, they were not to regard it."

— Plutarch, The Life of Eumenes.

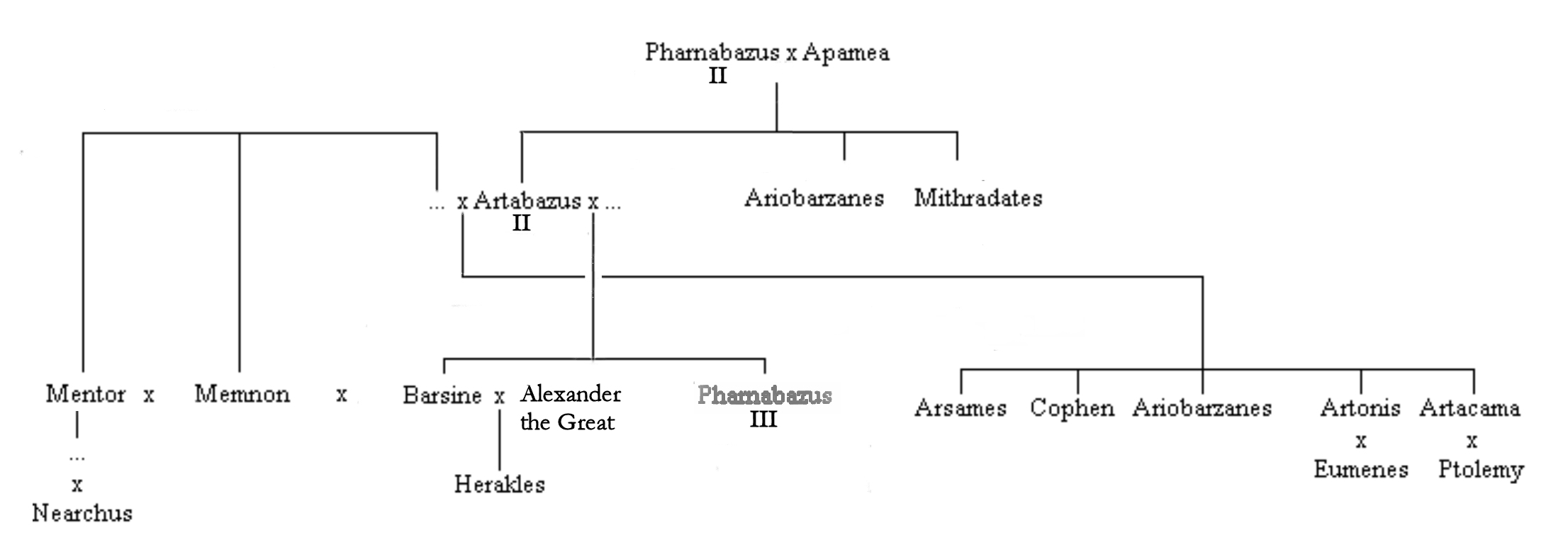
Family tree after Pharnabazus II.
