= Phoenix of Tenedos =

Ancient Greek general, associate of Eumenes of Cardia

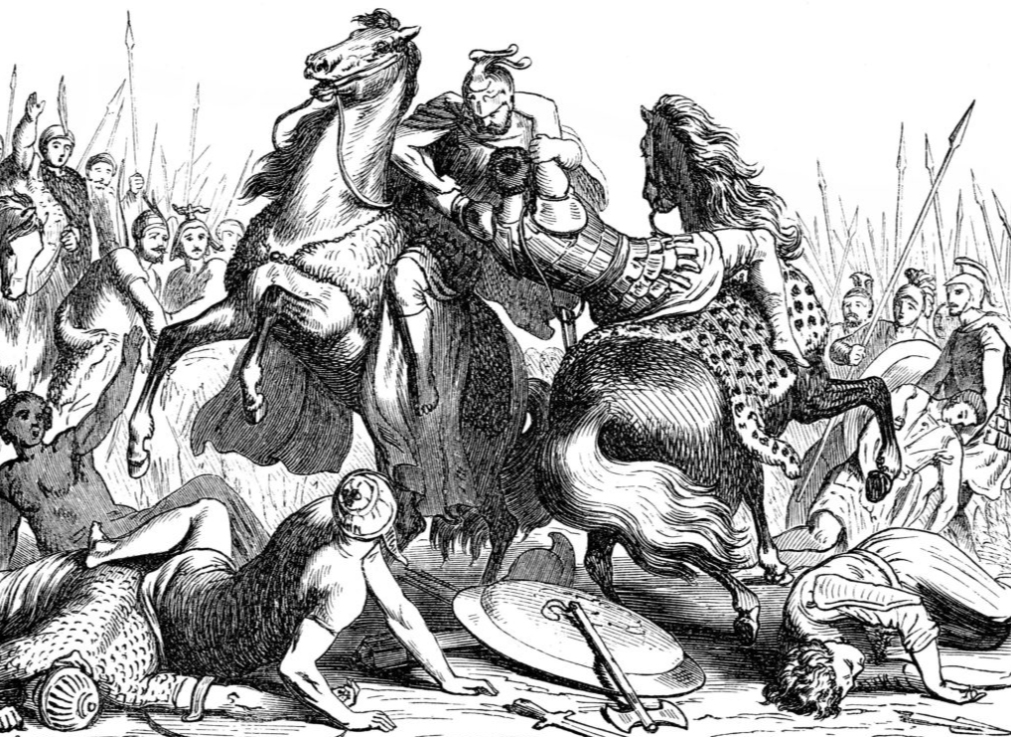
Phoenix of Tenedos commanded one of the cavalry squadrons in the Battle of the Hellespont (321 BC), Wars of the Diadochi. 1878 engraving.

Location of Tenedos in Asia Minor.

Phoenix (Ancient Greek: Φοῖνιξ; lived 4th century BC) was a native of Tenedos, who held a high rank in the army of Eumenes, 321 BC.

Battle of the Hellespont (321 BC)

In the great Battle of the Hellespont (321 BC) fought by the latter against Craterus and Neoptolemus, the command of the left wing, which was opposed to Craterus, was entrusted to Phoenix and Pharnabazus, and composed principally of Asiatic troops; Eumenes being apprehensive of opposing any Macedonians to a general so popular with his countrymen. As soon as they came in sight of the enemy the two commanders charged the army of Craterus, which was unable to withstand the shock, and the aged general himself perished in the confusion.

Shortly after we find Phoenix despatched by Eumenes with a select force against his revolted general Perdiccas, whom he surprised by a rapid night march, and took him prisoner almost without opposition.

Fall of Eumenes

After the fall of Eumenes (316 BC) Phoenix appears to have entered the service of Antigonus, but in 310 BC he was persuaded by Ptolemy (the nephew and general of Antigonus), to whom he was attached by the closest friendship, to join the latter in his defection from Antigonus. Phoenix at this time held the important command of the Hellespontine Phrygia, on which account Antigonus hastened to send an army against him under the command of his younger son Philip. The result of the operations is not mentioned; but Phoenix seems to have been not only pardoned by Antigonus, but received again into favour: and in the campaign which preceded the Battle of Ipsus (302 BC), we find him holding the command of Sardis, which he was, however, induced to surrender to Prepelaus, the general of Lysimachus. This is the last time his name is mentioned.
