= Battle of Cretopolis =

Battle during the Wars of the Diadochi

Battle of Cretopolis (Kretopolis)
- Part of the Diadochi Wars
Date	319 BC
Location	near Cretopolis (in Pisidia/Asia Minor) (modern-day Büğdüz, Burdur, Turkey)
Result	Antigonos victory

Belligerents
Anti-Perdiccan coalition	Perdiccan coalition

Commanders and leaders
Antigonos	Alketas; Attalos (POW); Polemon (POW); Dokimos (POW); Philotas (POW)

Strength
40,000 infantry 7,000 cavalry 30 elephants	20,000

Casualties and losses
Very low	Low

The Battle of Cretopolis (Kretopolis) was a battle in the wars of the successors of Alexander the Great (see Diadochi) between general Antigonus Monopthalmus and the remnants of the Perdiccan faction. It was fought near Cretopolis in Pisidia (a region of Asia Minor) in 319 BC and resulted in another stunning Antigonid victory (the second one that year).

== Background ==
After the death of Alexander the Great in 323 BC, his generals immediately began squabbling over his huge empire. Soon the squabbling degenerated into open warfare, with each general attempting to claim a portion of Alexander's vast Empire. One of the most talented successor generals (Diadochi) was Antigonus Monophthalmus, who was called so because of an eye he lost in a siege. After the second partition of the Empire, the Partition of Triparadisus in 321 BC, Antipater, the new regent of the Empire, made Antigonus, strategos of Asia and charged him with hunting down and defeating the remnants of the Perdiccan faction. Antigonus took command of the Royal Army and after being reinforced with more reliable troops from Antipater's European army he marched against their enemies in Asia-Minor. He first marched into Cappadocia against Eumenes whom he defeated at the Battle of Orkynia. Eumenes escaped to the fortress of Nora where Antigonus invested him.

== Prelude ==
Leaving the siege of Nora to a subordinate Antigonus then marched against the remaining Perdiccans who had gathered their forces in Pisidia near a town called Cretopolis. Alketas (a brother of Perdiccas), Attalos (Perdiccas brother-in-law), Polemon (Attalos's brother) and Dokimos had gathered their forces in a pass near Cretopolis. Antigonos decided to use the element of surprise, and forcemarched his army to Cretopolis in seven days (a march of close to 300 miles). In this way, Antigonus took his enemies by complete surprise: the first warning they had that Antigonus was nearby was the trumpeting of his elephants. Antigonus occupied a couple of hills overlooking Alketas's position.

== Battle ==
The Antigonid army numbered 40,000 infantry, 7,000 cavalry and 30 elephants, significantly outnumbering the 20,000-man strong Perdiccan army. The Perdiccans were caught unprepared, they faced an assault in front, along the pass, and in the flank from the hills overlooking the pass. Leaving Attalos and Dokimos to draw up the phalanx, Alketas took the cavalry and the peltasts and attacked Antigonus's troops on the ridge, trying desperately to dislodge them. During the fight for the ridge, Antigonus charged with his 6,000 cavalry into the pass and caught Alketas in the flank; at this Alketas was forced back from the ridge and just barely made it back to the phalanx, with the loss of most of his men. Unfortunately for the Perdiccans they did not have enough time to draw up their phalanx, and facing Antigonus's cavalry charge their men simply surrendered.

== Aftermath ==
Alketas managed to escape with a guard of Pisidians, who were particularly loyal to him, and made his way to the almost impregnable city of Termessos, here he would commit suicide when he heard the people of the city planned to hand him over to Antigonus. His colleagues Attalos, Polemon and Dokimos were captured by Antigonus, along with the rest of the army, which was around 16,000 foot soldiers and 900 horses. Antigonus could now claim to have destroyed the Perdiccan faction, but unfortunately for him Eumenes was not done causing trouble (see: Second War of the Diadochi).
