= Perdiccas (disambiguation) =

Perdiccas (c. 355 BC – 321/320 BC) was a general of Alexander the Great.

Perdiccas, or variants, may also refer to:

== People ==
- Perdiccas I of Macedon, ruled c. 653 BC
- Perdiccas II of Macedon, king 454–413 BC
- Perdiccas III of Macedon, king 365–359 BC
- Perdiccas (general under Eumenes) (died 321 BC)

== Fictional characters ==
- Perdikkas, a characters in the historical novel Funeral Games by Mary Renault

== Places ==
- Perdikkas, Kozani, village in Greece
