= 319 (disambiguation) =

319 may refer to:

- The year 319 or the year 319 BC
- 319 (number)
- "319", the title of a Prince song from the album The Gold Experience
- 319 Leona, an asteroid
- Airbus A319, a narrow-body airliner
- March 19 shooting incident, 2004 assassination attempt of then-President of Taiwan Chen Shui-bian
