= Stratonice (wife of Antigonus) =

Macedonian wife of Antigonus, king of Asia

Stratonice (Ancient Greek: Στρατoνίκη, romanized: Stratoníkē; fl. 4th century BC) was daughter of Corrhaeus (Κορῥαῖος, Korrhaĩos, a Macedonian otherwise unknown), and wife of Antigonus I, king of Asia, by whom she became the mother of two sons, Demetrius Poliorcetes and Philip, who died in 306 BC.

In 316 BC, she is mentioned as entering into negotiations with Docimus, when that general was shut up with the other adherents of Perdiccas, in a fortress of Phrygia: but having induced him to quit his stronghold, she caused him to be seized and detained as a prisoner. After the battle of Ipsus she fled from Cilicia (where she had awaited the issue of the campaign) with her son Demetrius to Salamis in Cyprus, 301 BC. Here she probably died, as nothing is mentioned of her when the island fell into the power of Ptolemy some years afterwards.
