= 319 BC =

319 BC in various calendars
Gregorian calendar	319 BC; CCCXIX BC
Ab urbe condita	435
Ancient Egypt era	XXXIII dynasty, 5
Pharaoh	Ptolemy I Soter, 5
Ancient Greek Olympiad (summer)	115th Olympiad, year 2
Assyrian calendar	4432
Balinese saka calendar	N/A
Bengali calendar	−912 – −911
Berber calendar	632
Buddhist calendar	226
Burmese calendar	−956
Byzantine calendar	5190–5191
Chinese calendar	辛丑年 (Metal Ox); 2379 or 2172 — to — 壬寅年 (Water Tiger); 2380 or 2173
Coptic calendar	−602 – −601
Discordian calendar	848
Ethiopian calendar	−326 – −325
Hebrew calendar	3442–3443
- Hindu calendars
Vikram Samvat	−262 – −261
Shaka Samvat	N/A
Kali Yuga	2782–2783
Holocene calendar	9682
Iranian calendar	940 BP – 939 BP
Islamic calendar	969 BH – 968 BH
Javanese calendar	N/A
Julian calendar	N/A
Korean calendar	2015
Minguo calendar	2230 before ROC 民前2230年
Nanakshahi calendar	−1786
Thai solar calendar	224–225
Tibetan calendar	阴金牛年 (female Iron-Ox) −192 or −573 or −1345 — to — 阳水虎年 (male Water-Tiger) −191 or −572 or −1344

Year 319 BC was a year of the pre-Julian Roman calendar. At the time, it was known as the Year of the Consulship of Cursor and Cerretanus (or, less frequently, year 435 Ab urbe condita). The denomination 319 BC for this year has been used since the early medieval period, when the Anno Domini calendar era became the prevalent method in Europe for naming years.

== Events ==
=== By place ===
==== Macedonian Empire ====
- Battle of Orkynia: Antigonus marches his army against Eumenes in Cappadocia and defeats him in battle at Orkynia.
- Eumenes retreats to the fortress of Nora. Antigonus follows him there and starts a siege.
- Battle of Cretopolis: Antigonus leaves a small force to besiege Eumenes, marches with the rest of his army against the remnants of the Perdiccan faction and defeats them at Cretopolis.
- The Athenian orator and diplomat, Demades, is sent to the Macedonian court, but either the Macedonian regent Antipater or his son Cassander, learning that Demades has intrigued with the former regent Perdiccas, puts him to death.
- Antipater becomes ill and dies shortly after, leaving the regency of the Macedonian Empire to the aged Polyperchon, passing over his son Cassander, a measure which gives rise to much confusion and ill-feeling.
- Polyperchon's authority is challenged by Antipater's son Cassander, who refuses to acknowledge the new regent. With the aid of Antigonus, ruler of Phrygia, and with the support of Ptolemy and Lysimachus, Cassander seizes most of Greece including Macedonia.
- Eumenes allies himself with the regent Polyperchon. He manages to escape from the siege of Nora, and his forces soon threaten Syria and Phoenicia. Polyperchon recognises Eumenes as the royal general in Asia Minor.
- Alexander the Great's widow, Roxana, joins Alexander's mother, Olympias, in Epirus.

== Births ==
- Antigonus II Gonatas, Macedonian king (approximate date) (d. 239 BC)
- Pyrrhus of Epirus, King of the Molossians, Epirus and Macedonia (d. 272 BC)

== Deaths ==
- Antipater, Macedonian general, regent of Alexander the Great's empire (b. 397 BC)

== Sources ==
=== Ancient Sources ===
- Diodorus Siculus, Bibliotheca Historica.
