= Aristonous (disambiguation) =

Aristonous (Ancient Greek: Ἀριστόνους) may refer to:

- Aristonous of Pella, a bodyguards of Alexander the Great
- Aristonous of Gela, described by Thucydides as one of the founders of the ancient Greek city of Agrigento (now in Italy) in 582 BCE.
- Aristonous of Aegina, an ancient Greek artist
- Aristonous, an ancient Greek Harpist, six times victor at the Pythian games
