= Cretopolis =

Town of ancient Pisidia, Lycia, or Pamphylia

Coordinates: 37°22′30″N 30°19′18″E

Cretopolis or Kretopolis (Ancient Greek: Κρητόπολις or Κρητῶν πόλις) was a town of ancient Pisidia, Lycia, or Pamphylia, according to various ancient writers. Historians of the Wars of the Diadochi, such as Diodorus, place it in Pisidia. Ptolemy places Cretopolis in the part of Cabalia, which he attaches to Pamphylia. Polybius places it in the Milyas, Lycia. The Battle of Cretopolis was fought nearby in 319 BC.

Its site is located at Buğdüz, near Yüreğil in Asiatic Turkey.
