= Battle of the Hellespont (321 BC) =

Part of the Wars of the Diadochi

First Battle of the Hellespont
- Part of the Wars of the Diadochi
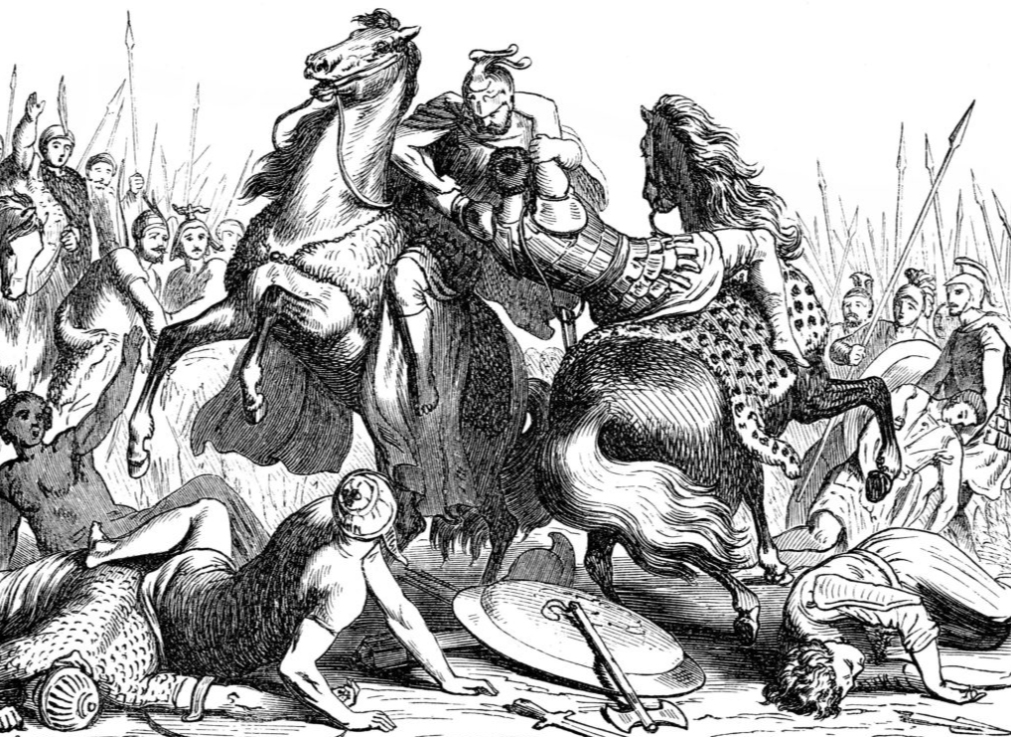
- The fight of Eumenes against Neoptolemus, Battle of the Hellespont (321 BC), Wars of the Diadochi. 1878 engraving.
Date	321 BC or 320 BC
Location	near the Dardanelles (modern-day Turkey) 40°N 28°E
Result	Eumenes victory

Belligerents
Anti-Perdiccan coalition	Perdiccan coalition

Commanders and leaders
Krateros †; Neoptolemos †	Eumenes; Pharnabazos; Phoinix

Strength
20,000	20,000
- Approximate location of the Battle of the Hellespont. Battle of the Hellespont (321 BC) (Turkey)

The Battle of the Hellespont took place in 321 or 320 BC between the armies of Craterus and Neoptolemus against Eumenes. It was part of the wars between Alexander's successors. Eumenes and Neoptolemus were sent by Perdiccas to prevent Craterus crossing the Hellespont into Asia, but Neoptolemus deserted to join Craterus. Eumenes won the battle, and both Craterus and Neoptolemus were killed.

== Prelude ==
The death of Alexander the Great in 323 BC threw his empire into a state of political and military turmoil, with his generals and governors splitting up the empire as his “Successors” (the Diadochi).

Perdiccas inherited the main Macedonian army and the title ‘regent of the Asiatic Empire.’ He also tried to marry Alexander’s sister Cleopatra of Macedon, which would have given him a claim to the Macedonian throne. Because of this a coalition of other successors formed against him. An army under Craterus was sent to Asia to confront Perdiccas and his allies. Perdiccas sent Eumenes and Neoptolemus with an army to the Hellespont to prevent Craterus from crossing into Asia. Neoptolemus, jealous of Eumenes, deserted with a few hundred horse and joined forces with Craterus.

== Battle ==
After crossing, when Craterus and Eumenes met, each had around 20,000 infantry but Craterus’ phalanx of veteran Macedonians was superior. Eumenes relied on his more numerous cavalry.

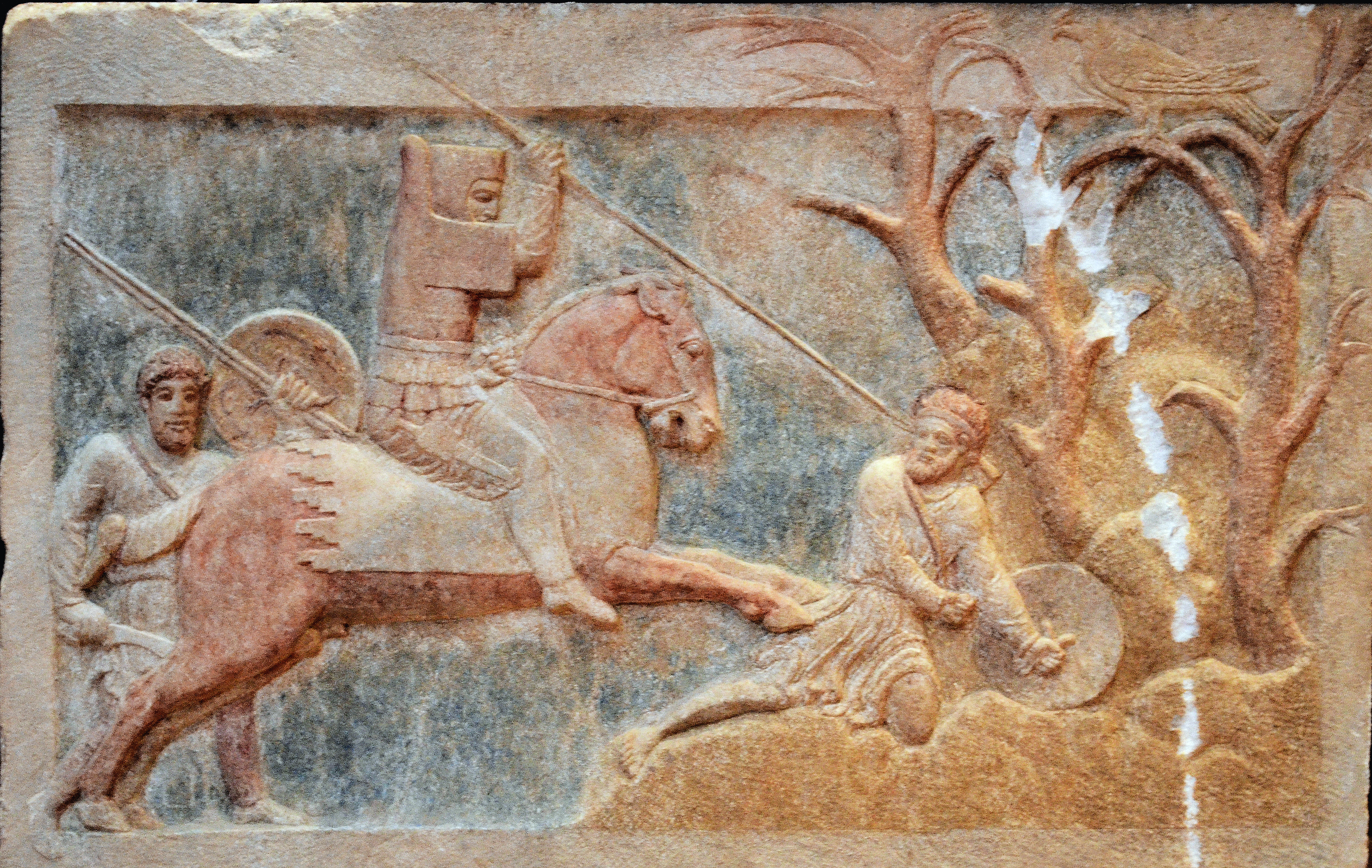
Persian cavalry from Asia Minor composed the superior cavalry of Eumenes. Altıkulaç Sarcophagus

Pharnabazus III, the former Persian satrap of Phrygia, was commanding a squadron of cavalry for Eumenes:

When he came to give battle, he would not set any Macedonian to engage Craterus, but appointed to that charge two bodies of foreign horse, commanded by Pharnabazus the son of Artabazus, and Phoenix of Tenedos. They had orders to advance on the first sight of the enemy, and come to close fighting without giving them time to retire; and if they attempted to speak or send any herald, they were not to regard it.

— Plutarch, The Life of Eumenes.

Both sides stationed their phalanx in the center and cavalry on the wings with Craterus and Eumenes commanding their own right wings. The phalanxes engaged and a stiff fight endued, characteristic of meetings of two Macedonian phalanxes.

The command of the cavalry was entrusted to Phoenix of Tenedos and Pharnabazus, and composed principally of Asiatic troops; Eumenes being apprehensive of opposing any Macedonians to a general so popular with his countrymen. As soon as they came in sight of the enemy the two commanders charged the army of Craterus, which was unable to withstand the shock, and the aged general himself perished in the confusion. With Craterus slain, his cavalry was scattered. On the other wing, Neoptolemus confronted Eumenes, and in single combat, Neoptolemus was killed. Craterus’ infantry, by now surrounded and leaderless, surrendered.

== Aftermath ==
Eumenes invited the defeated Macedonians to join him. They agreed, but took off by night to rejoin Antipater, the regent of Greece and Macedonia. The Battle of the Hellespont removed two contenders, but the War of the Successors would go on for another 40 years.
