= Philip (son of Antigonus) =

Antigonid prince

Philip (Ancient Greek: Φίλιππος; died 306 BC) was the son of Antigonus I Monophthalmus (the Macedonian king of Asia) and Stratonice, he was the younger brother of Demetrius I Poliorcetes (king of Macedon). In 310 BC his father placed him at the head of an army and sent him to oppose the revolt of Phoenix of Tenedos, and to recover possession of the towns on the Hellespont held by the latter. He died in 306 BC of unknown causes, just as Antigonus was setting out for his expedition against Egypt.
