= Arrhidaeus =

- Ἀρριδαῖoς

Regent of Macedon
- In office 320 BC – 320 BC Serving with Peithon
- Monarch: Alexander IV
- Preceded by: Perdiccas
- Succeeded by: Antipater

Personal details
- Occupation: General

Military service
- Allegiance: Macedonia
- Battles/wars: Wars of Alexander the Great; Wars of the Diadochi

Arrhidaeus or Arrhidaios (Greek: Ἀρριδαῖoς lived 4th century BC), one of Alexander the Great's generals, was entrusted by Ptolemy to bring Alexander's body to Egypt in 323 BC, contrary to the wishes of Perdiccas who wanted the body sent to Macedonia. On the murder of Perdiccas in Egypt in 321 BC, Arrhidaeus and Peithon were appointed temporary commanders in chief, but through the intrigues of the queen Eurydice they were obliged to resign soon afterwards their office at Triparadisus in Northern Syria. On the division of the provinces which was decided by those attending Triparadisus, Arrhidaeus obtained the Hellespontine Phrygia. In 319 BC, after the death of Antipater, Arrhidaeus made an unsuccessful attack upon Cyzicus; and Antigonus gladly seized this pretext to require him to resign his satrapy. Arrhidaeus, however, refused to resign and shut himself up in Cius.

== Notes ==
Political offices
Preceded by Perdiccas	Regent of Macedon; 320 BC with Peithon	Succeeded by Antipater
