= 306 BC =

306 BC in various calendars
Gregorian calendar	306 BC; CCCVI BC
Ab urbe condita	448
Ancient Egypt era	XXXIII dynasty, 18
Pharaoh	Ptolemy I Soter, 18
Ancient Greek Olympiad (summer)	118th Olympiad, year 3
Assyrian calendar	4445
Balinese saka calendar	N/A
Bengali calendar	−899 – −898
Berber calendar	645
Buddhist calendar	239
Burmese calendar	−943
Byzantine calendar	5203–5204
Chinese calendar	甲寅年 (Wood Tiger); 2392 or 2185 — to — 乙卯年 (Wood Rabbit); 2393 or 2186
Coptic calendar	−589 – −588
Discordian calendar	861
Ethiopian calendar	−313 – −312
Hebrew calendar	3455–3456
- Hindu calendars
Vikram Samvat	−249 – −248
Shaka Samvat	N/A
Kali Yuga	2795–2796
Holocene calendar	9695
Iranian calendar	927 BP – 926 BP
Islamic calendar	955 BH – 954 BH
Javanese calendar	N/A
Julian calendar	N/A
Korean calendar	2028
Minguo calendar	2217 before ROC 民前2217年
Nanakshahi calendar	−1773
Seleucid era	6/7 AG
Thai solar calendar	237–238
Tibetan calendar	ཤིང་ཕོ་སྟག་ལོ་ (male Wood-Tiger) −179 or −560 or −1332 — to — ཤིང་མོ་ཡོས་ལོ་ (female Wood-Hare) −178 or −559 or −1331

Year 306 BC was a year of the pre-Julian Roman calendar. At the time, it was known as the Year of the Consulship of Tremulus and Arvina (or, less frequently, year 448 Ab urbe condita). The denomination 306 BC for this year has been used since the early medieval period, when the Anno Domini calendar era became the prevalent method in Europe for naming years.

== Events ==
=== By place ===
==== Cyprus ====
- Demetrius Poliorcetes lands on Cyprus and besieges Menelaus, brother of Egypt's ruler, Ptolemy I Soter, at Salamis. Ptolemy Soter, coming to his brother's aid, is decisively defeated in the Battle of Salamis. The battle completely destroys the naval power of Egypt and results in the capture of Cyprus by Demetrius. This gives Demetrius' father, Antigonus I Monophthalmus, control of the Aegean and the eastern Mediterranean.

==== Syria ====
- Antigonus I Monophthalmus proclaims himself king of Asia Minor and northern Syria thus commencing the Antigonid dynasty. He appoints his son Demetrius king and co-regent.

==== Egypt ====
- Antigonus Monophthalmus tries to follow up his victory in Cyprus by invading Egypt with a large army and a formidable fleet, but Ptolemy Soter successfully holds the frontier against him. However, the year's events mean that Ptolemy no longer engages in overseas expeditions against Antigonus.

==== Thrace ====
- A four-drachma coin, picturing Alexander the Great, is issued by Lysimachos from this time until 281 BC. At least one of them is now preserved at the British Museum in London.

==== Italy ====
- The Samnites take Sora and Calatia, cities allied to the Romans, and enslave their inhabitants.
- The Romans invade Iapygia and begin a siege of Silvium (garrisoned by the Samnites). Eventually, they take the city by storm, taking 5,000 prisoners. After the Siege of Silvium they invade Samnium itself, pillaging the countryside for five months.

==== Sicily ====
- Agathocles tries to negotiate a settlement with Deinocrates, the leader of the exiles, but the latter refuses, forcing Agathocles to continue the war for dominance over eastern Sicily.
- A peace agreement is reached between Syracuse and Carthage. The peace restricts Carthaginian power in Sicily to the area west of the Halycus (Platani) River. This agreement allows the tyrant of Syracuse, Agathocles, to strengthen his rule over the Greek cities in the east of Sicily.

== Deaths ==
- Philip, youngest son of Antigonus Monophthalmus.
- Dionysius of Heraclea, tyrant of Heraclea Pontica.
