= Amphoterus (admiral) =

4th-century Macedonian admiral

Amphoterus (Greek: Ἀμφοτερός) the brother of Craterus, was appointed by Alexander the Great to be his commander of the fleet in the Hellespont in 333 BC. Amphoterus' appointment recognized his successful attempts to subdue the islands between Greece and Asia which had not acknowledged Alexander. Amphoterus cleared Crete of the Persians and pirates. He then sailed to the Peloponnese in 331 BC, where he put down an uprising against Macedonian control. Alexander sent Cypriot and Phoenician ships to help Amphoterus.

== Rebellion in the Peloponnese ==
There is disagreement among historical sources concerning Amphoterus' efforts to quash the rebellion in the Peloponnese. The Roman historian Quintus Curtius Rufus claims that in 331 BC Amphoterus was sent from the Palestinian coast to Crete with orders to attack the Persians who were blockading the island. His contemporary, the Roman historian Arrian, claims that Amphoterus was already stationed in the vicinity of Crete, and was ordered to sail for the Peloponnese coast. A. B. Bosworth, Professor of Classics and Ancient History at the University of Western Australia, believes that the conflict between the two accounts reflects different views as to the geographic location of Crete. He mentions that in the Periplus, a work attributed to Scylax of Caryanda, it appears that Crete was considered part of the Peloponnese at the time. As a result, Bosworth argues, both Roman historians are actually referring to the same general area when describing Amphoterus' military activities.
