= Peithon =

Ancient Macedonian military commander

- Πείθων

Regent of Macedon
- In office 320 BC – 320 BC Serving with Arrhidaeus
- Monarchs: Alexander IV & Philip III
- Preceded by: Perdiccas
- Succeeded by: Antipater

Satrap of Media
- In office 323 BC – 314 BC
- Monarch: Alexander IV

Personal details
- Born: c. 355 BC Eordaia, Macedonia
- Died: c. 314 BC (aged 41–42)
- Cause of death: Execution
- Occupation: Satrap, bodyguard, nobleman

Military service
- Allegiance: Macedonia
- Years of service: 335 – 314 BC
- Battles/wars: Wars of Alexander the Great; Wars of the Diadochi

Peithon or Pithon (Greek: Πείθων or Πίθων, c. 355 – c. 314 BC) was the son of Crateuas, a nobleman from Eordaia in western Macedonia. (Note: In the official list of Alexander's trierarchs in India, preserved by the contemporary admiral Nearchus, Peithon is classified as a Macedonian. The Roman historian Justin, writing many centuries later, described Peithon as an "Illyrian". However, the Greek historian Arrian, who was his contemporary, and who drew his information from a well-informed list that is probably traced back to Ptolemy, described Peithon as an Eordaean (a native of Macedonian Eordaea), together with Ptolemy, son of Lagos, who was indeed an Eordaean, as is corroborated by Posidippus' epigrams.) He was famous for being one of the bodyguards of Alexander the Great, becoming the later satrap of Media, and claiming to be one of the diadochi.

== Biography ==
Peithon was named one of the seven (later eight) Somatophylakes "bodyguards" of Alexander in 335 BC. After Alexander's death in 323 BC, Peithon was made the satrap of Media, the strategically important region that controlled all roads between east and west. The satrapy was too large for one man; Peithon would be very powerful, and could destabilize the entire empire. Therefore, he had to give up the northern part, which was given to Atropates; from then on the region was known as Media Atropatene.

The soldiers who remained in the eastern part of Alexander's realm after his death grew agitated by their lengthy stay abroad, and began spontaneous revolts. The regent Perdiccas sent Peithon to subdue the revolts. He was given a contingent of Macedonians. Peithon easily defeated his opponents and accepted their capitulation. His men, however, having hoped to plunder, massacred their opponents.

After Peithon returned to Media, Perdiccas began to distrust him. During the First War of the Diadochi, Perdiccas ordered Peithon to reinforce him and help him invade Ptolemaic Egypt and fight against Ptolemy. In summer 320 BC, Peithon, Seleucus, and Antigenes murdered Perdiccas and started negotiating with their opponents. Ptolemy suggested that Peithon be made the new regent, but the other diadochi would not accept this. Therefore, Antipater was chosen to be the new regent.

After the death of Antipater (the Regent of the Empire), Peithon tried to expand his power over the eastern satrapies. He invaded the satrapy of Parthia, killed its satrap Philip, and made his brother Eudemus the new satrap. The other satraps in inner Asia were quick to perceive their danger and united all their forces under Peucestas (also a former Somatophylax), the satrap of Persia, who defeated Peithon, and drove him from Parthia. Peithon returned to Media, and then went on to Babylon to try to persuade Seleucus to back him in an attempt to reassert his authority. While in Babylon Eumenes and his army arrived from the west, Eumenes was gathering forces for a showdown with Antigonus Monopthalmus, the Strategos of Asia. Peithon and Seleucus rejected Eumenes's request to join his cause (he claimed to be fighting for the kings Alexander IV and Philip III). Eumenes, then, went on to Susiana, where he found the forces of the upper satrapies under Peucestas. Peithon joined the army of Antigonus, who had come east in pursuit of Eumenes. During the battles of Paraitakene and Gabiene Peithon commanded the left flank of Antigonus's army. At Paraitakene he almost lost the battle by charging the enemy without orders, but he redeemed himself at Gabiene by winning the battle on the left flank. After the Second War of the Diadochi, Peithon was among the most powerful diadochi in the eastern part of the empire and he started to build his power again. Antigonus felt threatened by Peithon's growing power so he tricked him into coming to his court, where he had him executed.

Political offices
Preceded by Perdiccas	Regent of Macedon; 320 BC with Arrhidaeus	Succeeded by Antipater
