= 239 BC =

239 BC in various calendars
Gregorian calendar	239 BC; CCXXXIX BC
Ab urbe condita	515
Ancient Egypt era	XXXIII dynasty, 85
Pharaoh	Ptolemy III Euergetes, 8
Ancient Greek Olympiad (summer)	135th Olympiad, year 2
Assyrian calendar	4512
Balinese saka calendar	N/A
Bengali calendar	−832 – −831
Berber calendar	712
Buddhist calendar	306
Burmese calendar	−876
Byzantine calendar	5270–5271
Chinese calendar	辛酉年 (Metal Rooster); 2459 or 2252 — to — 壬戌年 (Water Dog); 2460 or 2253
Coptic calendar	−522 – −521
Discordian calendar	928
Ethiopian calendar	−246 – −245
Hebrew calendar	3522–3523
- Hindu calendars
Vikram Samvat	−182 – −181
Shaka Samvat	N/A
Kali Yuga	2862–2863
Holocene calendar	9762
Iranian calendar	860 BP – 859 BP
Islamic calendar	886 BH – 885 BH
Javanese calendar	N/A
Julian calendar	N/A
Korean calendar	2095
Minguo calendar	2150 before ROC 民前2150年
Nanakshahi calendar	−1706
Seleucid era	73/74 AG
Thai solar calendar	304–305
Tibetan calendar	阴金鸡年 (female Iron-Rooster) −112 or −493 or −1265 — to — 阳水狗年 (male Water-Dog) −111 or −492 or −1264

Year 239 BC was a year of the pre-Julian Roman calendar. At the time it was known as the Year of the Consulship of Turrinus and Falto (or, less frequently, year 515 Ab urbe condita). The denomination 239 BC for this year has been used since the early medieval period, when the Anno Domini calendar era became the prevalent method in Europe for naming years.

== Events ==
=== By place ===
==== Carthage ====
- Concerned that Hamilcar Barca's leniency in pardoning those who he has captured who have participated in the Mercenary War will encourage others to defect, Mathos and Spendius order the mutilation and execution of "about seven hundred" Carthaginian prisoners, including Gesco. With the mercenaries jointly guilty of these atrocities, defectors dare not face Carthaginian justice under Hamilcar.
- Carthage is besieged by the mercenary armies, while the city of Utica revolts and attempts to secede from Carthage. Carthage appeals to Hiero II of Syracuse and to Rome for aid against the mercenaries. However, the mercenary leaders reject the efforts of Roman mediators.
- Sardinia revolts against Carthage and Rome takes the opportunity to annex the island.

==== Greece ====
- Antigonus II, King of Macedonia, dies and is succeeded by his son, Demetrius II.
- With Aetolia now as its ally, the Achaean League under the command of Aratus of Sicyon repeatedly attacks Athens and Argos.

==== Seleucid Empire ====
- Seleucus II's brother Antiochus Hierax, who is governor of Seleucid Anatolia, sends an army into Syria ostensibly to assist Seleucus but actually to seize the rest of the empire. After achieving peace with Egypt, Seleucus II promptly invades Anatolia and begins the "War of the Brothers".

==== Persia ====
- Diodotus of Bactria defeats an army of Parthians. He dies shortly thereafter and is succeeded by his son Diodotus II.

==== China ====
- Cheng Jiao, the half-brother of Ying Zheng, the king of Qin, is sent to attack the State of Zhao, but he attempts to usurp power and is defeated and executed.
- Qin Prime Minister Lü Buwei publishes the "Spring and Autumn Annals of Lü Buwei" (Lüshi Chunqiu).
- Rough date: The Zhao general Pang Nuan captures the Qi city of Rao'an and the Yan cities of Li and Yangcheng.

==== Korea ====
- Haemosu, who is a descendant of the people of the empire of Gojoseon, establishes the ancient kingdom of Bukbuyeo in modern-day Jilin, northeast China.

== Births ==
- Quintus Ennius, Latin poet and writer, considered the father of Roman poetry (approximate date)

== Deaths ==
- Antigonus II Gonatas, king of Macedon from 277 BC who has rebuilt his kingdom's power and established its hegemony over Greece (b. c. 319 BC)
- Diodotus I, king of the Greco-Bactrian Kingdom (b. c. 285 BC)
- Huanhui of Han, Chinese king of the Han State
