= Perdiccas (general under Eumenes) =

Perdiccas (Greek: Περδίκκας; died 321 BC) was a commander under Eumenes in the war against Antigonus in 321 BC. He was preparing to desert to the enemy when Eumenes became apprised of his project and sent Phoenix of Tenedos against him, who surprised his camp in the night, took him prisoner and brought him before Eumenes, who had him put to death.
