= Docimus =

Antigonos Dokimos, commonly shortened and Latinized as Docimus (Ancient Greek: Δόκιμoς; lived 4th century BC), was one of the officers in the Macedonian army.

After the death of Alexander the Great (323 BC) he supported the party of Perdiccas. Docimus was tasked with capturing Babylon, while Perdiccas advanced against Ptolemy.

After the death of Perdiccas (321 BC) he united with Attalus and Alcetas, and was taken prisoner together with the former when their combined forces were defeated by Antigonus in Pisidia, 320 BC. The captives were confined in a strong fort, but, during the expedition of Antigonus against Eumenes, they contrived to overpower their guards, and make themselves masters of the fortress (316 BC). Docimus, however, having quit the castle to carry on a negotiation with Stratonice, the wife of Antigonus, was again made prisoner. He appears after this to have entered the service of Antigonus, as we find him in 313 BC sent by that prince with an army to establish the freedom of the Greek cities in Caria. In the campaign preceding the battle of Ipsus (301 BC), he held the strong fortress of Synnada in Phrygia in charge for Antigonus, but was induced to surrender it into the hands of Lysimachus.

It is probable that he had been governor of the adjoining Phrygian district for some time: and he had founded there the city called after him Docimium. His name is not mentioned after the fall of Antigonus.

== Sources and references ==
- Smith, William (editor); Dictionary of Greek and Roman Biography and Mythology, "Docimus", Boston, (1867)
- Catholic Encyclopaedia (Docimium)
