= Neoptolemus (general) =

Officer under Alexander the Great

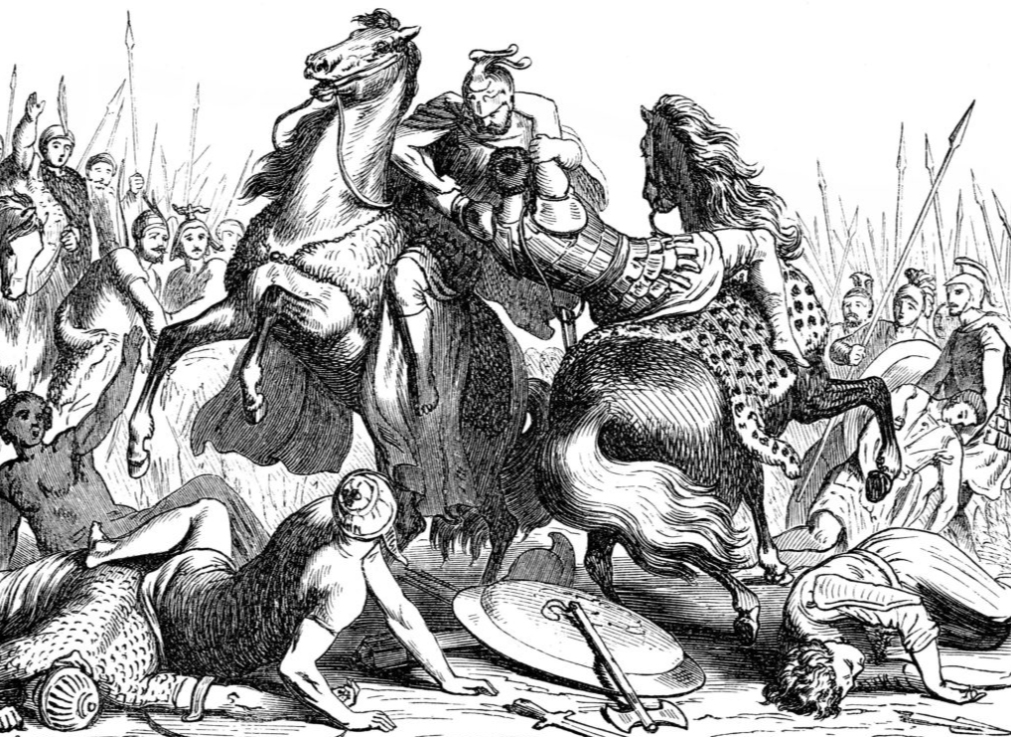
Neoptolemus being defeated in an individual fight with Eumenes, Battle of the Hellespont (321 BC), Wars of the Diadochi, 1878 engraving.

Neoptolemus (Ancient Greek: Νεoπτόλεμος; died 321 BC) was a Macedonian officer who served under Alexander the Great.

According to Arrian he belonged to the race of the Aeacidae, so he was probably related to the family of the kings of Epirus.

Neoptolemus is mentioned as serving in the Macedonian royal guards (ἑταῖροι) and distinguished himself particularly at the siege of Gaza, 332 BC, where he was the first to scale the walls.

Little has been written about him during the subsequent campaigns of Alexander; however, he appears to have earned a reputation as an able soldier. Dexippus lists the satrapy of Carmania as assigned to Neoptolemus after the death of Alexander; however, Diodorus and Justin assign this satrapy to Tlepolemus instead. A. G. Roos revised Dexippus' text to assign Carmania to Tlepolemus and Armenia to Neoptolemus. Pat Wheatley and Waldemar Heckel found this revision to be unlikely to represent the original text, and considered it more likely that the fragment of the text of Dexippus includes a scribal error, as "Neoptolemus" is an easy corruption of "Tlepolemus". Neoptolemus apparently campaigned in Armenia after the death of Alexander, but his official status in this area is unclear; he might have been a strategos rather than a satrap. Neoptolemus managed only to create havoc in Armenia, which suggests that he wasn't cooperating with any existing satrap.

As Neoptolemus had a reputation of being restless and unsettled, Perdiccas regarded him with suspicion. So in 321 BC, when Perdiccas set out for Ptolemaic Egypt, he placed Neoptolemus under the command of Eumenes, who was told to exercise particular vigilance regarding Neoptolemus.

Perdiccas' suspicions turned out to be well founded: Neoptolemus immediately entered into correspondence with the hostile Macedonian leaders, Antipater and Craterus, and, on being ordered by Eumenes to join him with his contingent, refused to comply. In response, Eumenes immediately marched against him, defeated his army, and compelled all the Macedonian troops in his service to take the oath of fidelity to Perdiccas.

Neoptolemus managed to escape with a small body of cavalry and joined Craterus, whom he persuaded to march immediately against Eumenes, while the latter was still celebrating his victory and unprepared for a fresh attack. But their cautious adversary was not taken by surprise and met his enemies in a pitched battle. During this battle, Neoptolemus commanded the left wing, on which he was opposed to Eumenes himself; and the two leaders, who were bitter personal enemies, sought each other out during the battle and engaged in single combat, in which, after a desperate struggle, Neoptolemus was slain by Eumenes.
