= Aristonous of Pella =

4th-century BC Greek general

Aristonous of Pella (Ancient Greek: Ἀριστόνους), son of Peisaeus (Πεισαῖος), who was one of the somatophylakes bodyguards of Alexander the Great, distinguished himself greatly on one occasion in India. On the death of Alexander, he was one of the first to propose that the supreme power should be entrusted to Perdiccas. He was subsequently Olympias' general in the war with Cassander; and when Olympias was taken prisoner in 316 BC, he was put to death by order of Cassander.

Aristonous is described as of both Pellaean and Eordaean in origin, which would mean that he was from Eordaea but raised at the court in Pella. According to Plutarch, a certain somatophylax, Aristophanes, took away Alexander's sword when he was quarrelling with Cleitus the Black, but this reference seems to be confused with Aristonous.
