= Craterus =

General of Alexander the Great (c.370–321 BC)

- Κόνων
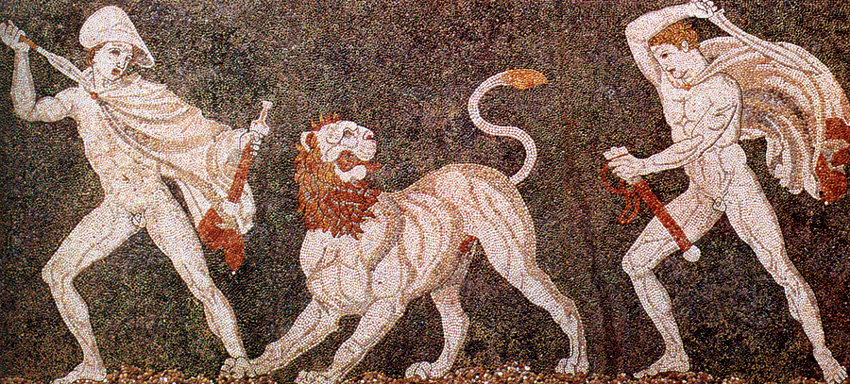
- Alexander and Craterus in a lion hunt, mosaic in Pella
- Born: c. 370 BC
- Died: c. 321 BC (aged c. 49)
- Spouse(s): Amastris (m. 324 BC); Phila (m. 322 BC)
- Military career
- Allegiance: Macedonia
- Service years: 334 - 321 BC
- Conflicts: Battle of the Granicus; Battle of Issus; Battle of Gaugamela; Battle of the Persian Gate; Siege of Cyropolis; Lamian War Battle of Crannon: First Battle of the Hellespont †

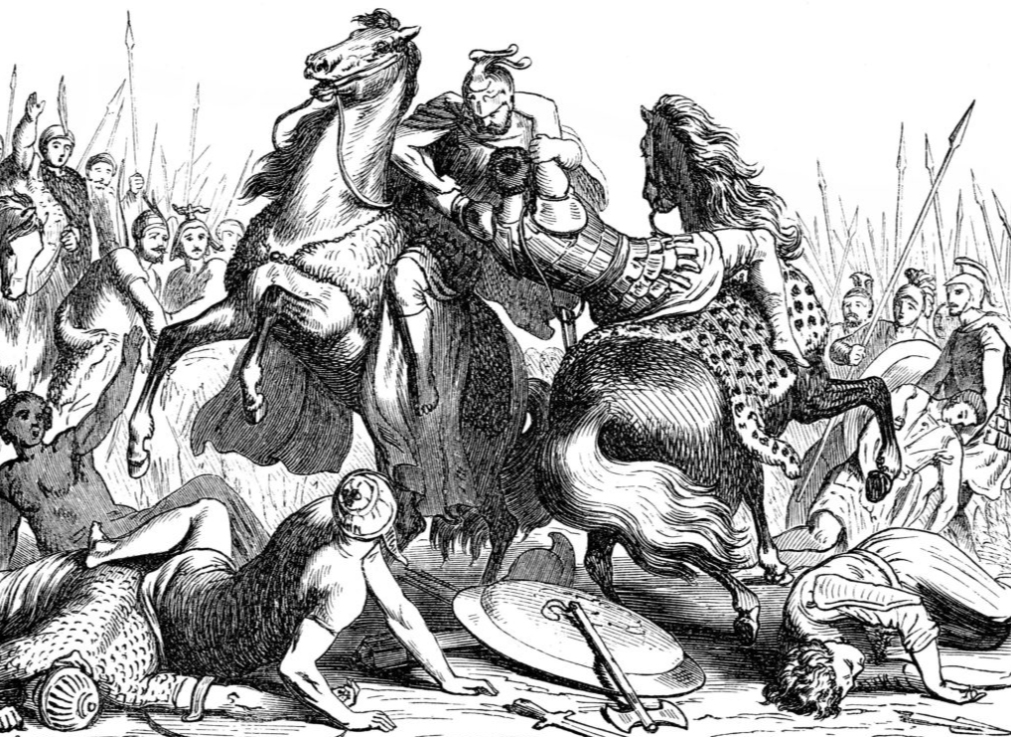
In 321 BC, Craterus was killed in the battle in which Eumenes defeated Neoptolemus, in the Battle of the Hellespont (321 BC), Wars of the Diadochi. 1878 engraving.

Craterus, also spelled Krateros (Greek: Κρατερός; c. 370 BC – 321 BC), was a Macedonian general under Alexander the Great and one of the Diadochi. Throughout his life, he was a loyal supporter of Alexander the Great.

Craterus was the son of a Macedonian nobleman named Alexander from Orestis and brother of admiral Amphoterus. Craterus commanded the phalanx and all infantry on the left wing in Battle of Issus in 333 BC. In Hyrcania, he was sent on a mission against the Tapurians, his first independent command with the Macedonian army. At the Battle of the Hydaspes in 326 BC, near modern Jhelum, he commanded the rearguard, which stayed on the western bank; his men crossed the river only during the final stages of the battle.

During his time as Alexander's companion, Craterus seemed to have rivalry with Hephaestion, the King's closest friend and possible lover, regarding Alexander's favour. Diodorus Siculus reports that the monarch honoured Hephaestion the most among his companions even though Craterus's love rivaled the former's; Alexander justified his stance by expresssing belief that Craterus only loves him because of his power while Hephaestion loves him as the person, describing the two as 'king-loving' (philobasileus) and 'Alexander-loving' (philoalexandros), respectively. During the campaign in India, Craterus and Hephaestion's enmity reached its peak with the two clashing on swords with each other; Alexander intervened by publicly yelling at Hephaestion, while Craterus was reproached by him in private. Plutarch claims that soon after this incident, the King demanded the two men to reconcile under threat of death penalty and they are said to never quarrel again.

At the festivities in Susa, Craterus married princess Amastris, daughter of Oxyathres, the brother of Darius III. Craterus left Alexander's troops in Opis in 324 BC. Craterus and Polyperchon were appointed to lead 11,500 veteran soldiers back to Macedonia and replace Antipater who was ordered to lead a fresh contingent of soldiers to join Alexander's army in the east. But Craterus' arrival to Macedonia was delayed by a lack of vessels for the transport over the sea. Craterus stayed in Cilicia, where he was building the fleet, when Alexander unexpectedly died in Babylon. In case Craterus wouldn't be able to govern in Macedonia due to his health, his successor was to be Polyperchon. At the time, he had about 10,000 veterans with him. Craterus eventually crossed into Europe when Antipater requested assistance from several commanders in the Lamian war, but leaving the supreme command in possession of Antipater.

He sailed with his Cilician navy to Greece and led troops at the Battle of Crannon in August 322 BC. When Antigonus rose in rebellion against Perdiccas and Eumenes, Craterus joined him, alongside Antipater and Ptolemy. He married Antipater's daughter Phila, with whom he had a son, also called Craterus.

He was killed in Asia Minor during the battle of the Hellespont, fighting against Eumenes. Eumenes put his own Macedonian troops on the opposite side from Craterus and deliberately did not tell them who the opposition was, from fear that they would go over to Craterus. Craterus was speared by a Thracian (or other) and fell off his horse, where he died of the field--either unrecognized (according to Diodorus) or with Eumenes in pitying attendance (so Plutarch, giving him a heroic instead of ignoble end).

== In popular media ==
- Named with the phonetically accurate spelling of Krateros, Craterus is one of the minor characters in the historical novel Roxana Romance by A.J. Cave.
- Also named as Krateros, Craterus is a major character in the two Alexander novels by Mary Renault, The Persian Boy and Fire From Heaven.
- In the film Alexander, he is played by British actor Rory McCann.
- Appears as a special unit in the Civilization VI scenario Conquests of Alexander.
