= Waldemar Heckel =

Canadian historian of ancient Greece (born 1949)

- Born: 1949 (age 76–77); Bad Königshofen, Germany

Academic background
- Education: McMaster University (MA, 1973); University of British Columbia (PhD, 1978)

Academic work
- Discipline: Greek history
- Institutions: University of Calgary (retired)

Waldemar Heckel (born 1949) is a Canadian historian.

Heckel was born in Bad Königshofen, Germany in 1949. He attained his master's degree in 1973 from McMaster University in Hamilton, Ontario, and earned his doctorate in 1978 at the University of British Columbia in Vancouver, British Columbia. His dissertation on the "marshals" of Alexander the Great also formed the basis for his 1992 work on this subject. Heckel is internationally regarded as a researcher on Alexander the Great, and has published numerous works on this. Other focal points of his research are ancient Greek history and ancient Greek warfare.

Until his retirement in late 2013, Heckel taught as a professor of ancient history at the University of Calgary.

== Selected publications ==
=== Monographs ===
- The Conquests of Alexander the Great. Cambridge Univ. Press, 2007.
- Who's Who in the Age of Alexander the Great. Prosopography of Alexander's Empire. Blackwell, 2006.
- The Marshals of Alexander's empire. Routledge, 1992; 2nd ed., Alexander’s Marshals: A Study of the Makedonian Aristocracy and the Politics of Military Leadership, 2016.
- The Last Days and Testament of Alexander the Great: A Prosopographic Study. Stuttgart: Steiner, 1988.

=== Commentary and translation ===
- Livy: The Dawn of the Roman Empire (Books 31-40). Translated by JC Yardley, comment by Waldemar Heckel. Oxford University Press, 2000.
- Justin: Epitome of the Philippic History of Pompeius Trogus. Volume I, Books 11-12: Alexander the Great, 1997; Volume II: Books 13-15: The Successors to Alexander the Great, 2011. Translated by JC Yardley, comment by Waldemar Heckel. Oxford Univ. Press.
- Quintus Curtius Rufus: The History of Alexander. Translated by JC Yardley, with introduction, notes and commentary by Waldemar Heckel. Penguin, 1984; corrected edition 2001 (several reprints).

=== Edited volumes ===
- Alexander the Great. A New History. Edited with Lawrence A. Tritle. Wiley-Blackwell, 2009.
- Alexander the Great. Historical Sources in Translation. Edited with John C. Yardley. Blackwell, 2004.
- Crossroads of History: The Age of Alexander. Edited with Lawrence A. Tritle. Regina Books, 2003.
- Ancient Coins of the Graeco-Roman World: The Nickle Numismatic Papers. Edited with Richard Sullivan. Wilfrid Laurier Univ. Press, 1984.
