= Perdiccas =

Macedonian general and regent (355–320 BC)

- Περδίκκας
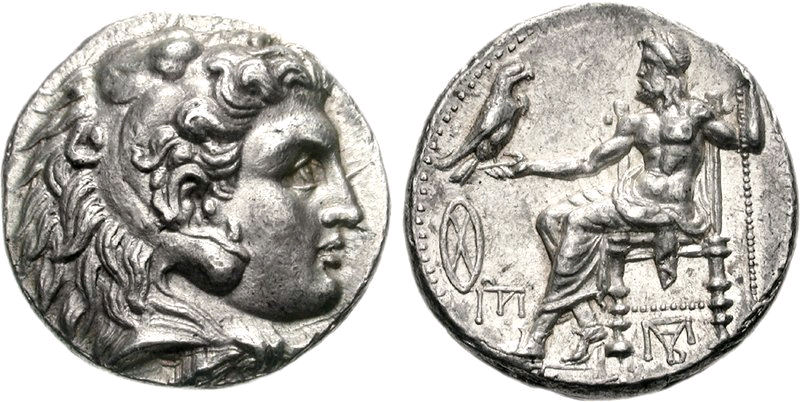
- Silver tetradrachm of Philip III Arrhidaeus struck under Perdiccas in Babylon, circa 323–320 BC.

Regent of Macedon
- In office 323 BC – 320 BC
- Monarchs: Alexander IV and Philip III
- Preceded by: Last held by Ptolemy of Aloros (368–365 BC)
- Succeeded by: Peithon and Arrhidaeus

Personal details
- Born: c. 355 BC
- Died: 320 BC (aged 34–36)
- Cause of death: Killed by his own soldiers
- Spouse(s): Daughter of Atropates; Nicaea of Macedon
- Parent: Orontes (father)
- Occupation: General; Regent

Military service
- Allegiance: Macedonia
- Years of service: 335 – 320 BC
- Battles/wars: Wars of Alexander the Great; Battle of Thebes; Battle of Gaugamela; Battle of Hydaspes; First War of the Diadochi X

Perdiccas (Greek: Περδίκκας, Perdikkas; c. 355 BC – 320 BC) was a Macedonian general and bodyguard (somatophylax) of Alexander the Great, and the regent of Alexander's empire after his death. When Alexander was dying, he entrusted his signet ring to Perdiccas, initially the most pre-eminent of the successors due to being second-in-command. Perdiccas effectively ruled Alexander's increasingly unstable empire from Babylon for three years until his assassination.

Perdiccas was born to Macedonian nobility. A supporter, somatophylax (bodyguard) and hetairos (elite cavalry commander) of Alexander, he took part in Alexander's campaign against the Achaemenid Persian Empire, distinguishing himself at the battles of Thebes and Gaugamela, and followed Alexander into India. When Alexander died in 323 BC, Perdiccas rose to become supreme commander of the imperial army, as well as regent for Alexander's vast empire, ruling on behalf of Alexander's intellectually disabled heir, King Philip III Arrhidaeus, and Alexander's infant son, King Alexander IV of Macedon.

Perdiccas gained supreme power as guardian of the two kings, but also inherited the problems of Alexander's quickly conquered and unstable empire. To consolidate power and retain authority, Perdiccas crushed numerous revolts, like that of Ariarathes, and assassinated rivals, like Meleager. Perdiccas' position as regent was never fully secure, however, and his authority was repeatedly contested by other high officers. His attempt to marry Cleopatra of Macedon, Alexander's sister, which would have given him claim to the Macedonian throne, angered critical generals—including Antipater, Craterus and Antigonus—who decided to revolt against the regent in the First War of the Diadochi. In response to this formidable coalition and a provocation from another general, Ptolemy, Perdiccas invaded Egypt, but his soldiers mutinied and killed him in 320 BC when the invasion foundered.

== Family background and early life ==
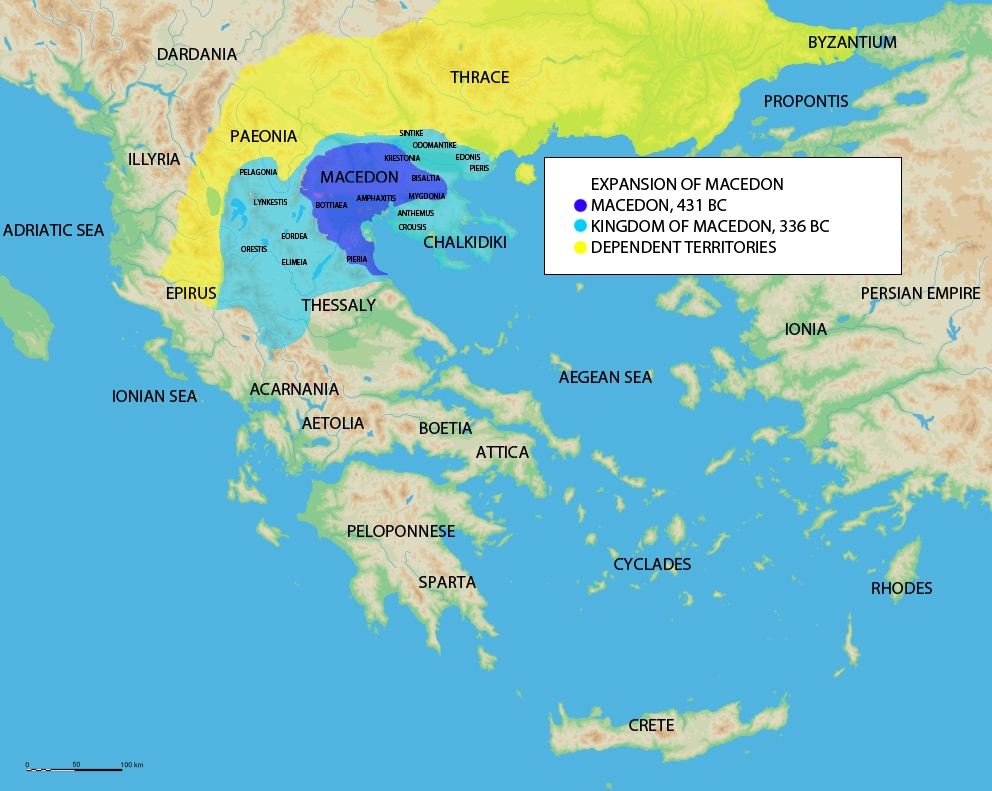
Map of ancient Macedon. Perdiccas was born in Orestis, located in the light blue region to the left of the dark blue region (Macedon itself) above

According to the 2nd-century historian Arrian, Perdiccas was the son of the Macedonian nobleman Orontes, a descendant of the independent princes of the Macedonian province of Orestis. While Perdiccas' actual date of birth is unknown, he would seem to have been of a similar age to Alexander; historian Tristan Hughes estimated that he was born around 361 BC and historian Waldemar Heckel described him as younger than Ptolemy, son of Lagus. He had a younger brother called Alcetas and a sister, Atalante, who married Attalus. Perdiccas may have had, through some distant relation, blood of the Argead royal family.

Little is known of Perdiccas' youth, but he was probably brought to the Macedonian court in Pella to serve as page like many other young nobles alongside Alexander. (Note: Writer Alex Rowson argued that Perdiccas was "probably" among the royal pages who were educated alongside Alexander by Aristotle at Mieza, allowing him to befriend the prince.) In 336 BC, when Pausanias assassinated King Philip II of Macedon, the father of Alexander the Great, Perdiccas was among those who chased the assassin down and killed him.

An anecdote reports that Perdiccas once went into the cave of a lioness who had recently given birth, and stole two of its cubs. Another tells a story of his fondness for exercise, along with his fellow Orestian and successor, Craterus.

== Career under Alexander ==
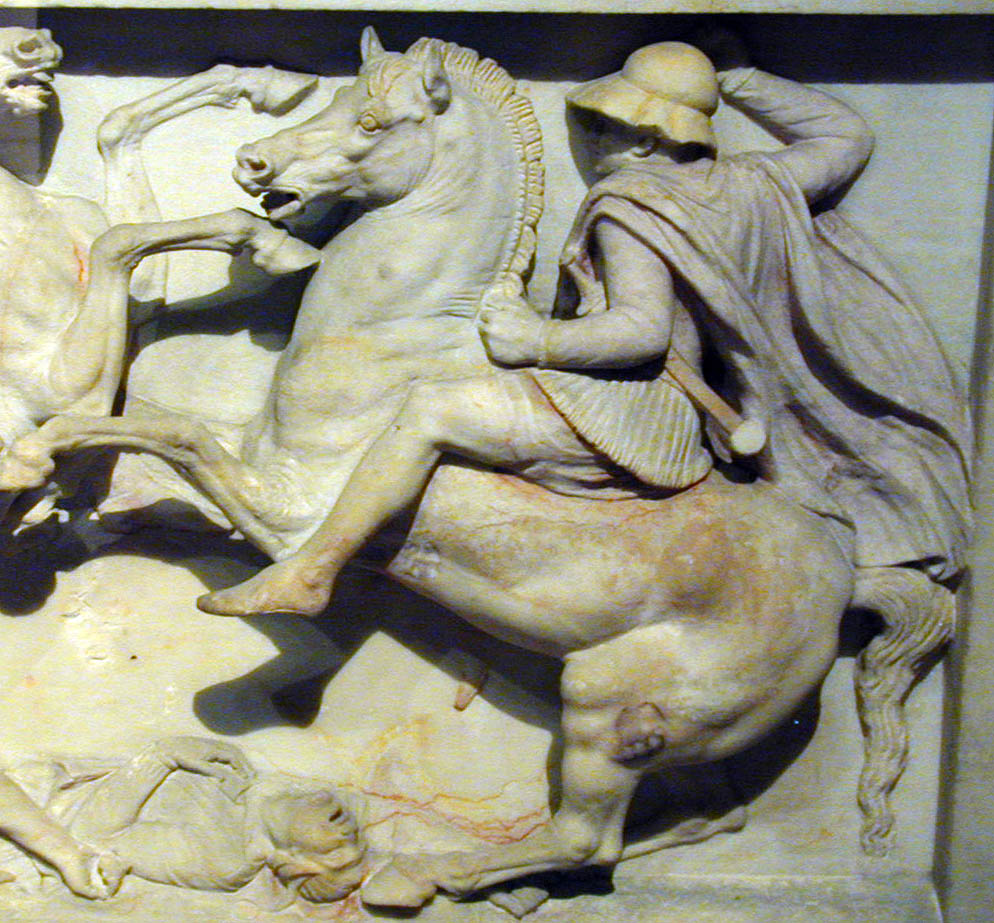
Relief carving of a mounted horseman on the Alexander Sarcophagus of Sidon. Depicting the Battle of Issus, this figure is often identified as Perdiccas.

Compared to other companions and boyhood friends of Alexander, Perdiccas earned an "early promotion" when he was appointed the commander of a battalion of the Macedonian phalanx (heavy infantry). In 335 BC, Perdiccas fought in the Balkan campaigns of Alexander against the Illyrian peoples located northwest of Macedon. In the same year, he distinguished himself during the conquest of Thebes, which had rebelled against Macedon following the death of Philip II. He was heavily wounded during the fighting, but the sources differ on Perdiccas's exact role at Thebes. According to Diodorus Siculus, Perdiccas led a contingent which stormed the rear gate of the city on the orders of Alexander; Arrian instead reported that the battalion commander organized an unsanctioned assault on the Theban defenses, breaking through and allowing Alexander to exploit the breach. Historian Alexander Demandt argued that Perdiccas' assault disrupted Alexander's attempt to negotiate a peaceful solution with Thebes.

Afterward, Perdiccas accompanied Alexander on his campaigns against the Achaemenid Persian Empire. Sources generally agree that Perdiccas was a loyal soldier of Alexander. For example, the ancient historian Plutarch reports the following conversation between the two prior to the Battle of Granicus (the first encounter between Alexander and the Persians), when Alexander was allotting lands and properties to his followers:

So that at last [Alexander] had portioned out or engaged almost all the royal property; which giving Perdiccas an occasion to ask him what he would leave himself, he replied, his hopes. "Your soldiers," replied Perdiccas, "will be your partners in those," and refused to accept of the estate he had assigned him. Some others of his friends did the like...

Perdiccas led his battalion at the battles of Granicus, Issus, and Gaugamela, where he again distinguished himself and was wounded. Perdiccas became a somatophylax ('bodyguard') of Alexander following this, and his influence probably grew steadily thereafter. Perdiccas' battalion was used by Alexander to flank and win the Battle of the Persian Gate in 330 BC. When Philotas, the son of Parmenion and an important general in Alexander's army, was held in suspicion by the king, Perdiccas was among the close companions who joined Alexander in discussing what should be done. When a drunk Alexander attempted to kill another of his companions, Cleitus the Black, in 328 BC, Perdiccas was among those who held Alexander back before he ultimately succeeded.

Subsequently, he held an important command in the Indian campaigns of Alexander. Perdiccas and Hephaestion, Alexander's closest companion, were generally compatible and seemed to have got along well, as both were selected by Alexander to ford the Indus River (a task which required coordination) and did so without issue. This contrasts Hephaestion's known quarrels with other prominent generals of Alexander, such as Craterus and Eumenes of Cardia. Alongside their compatibility, Perdiccas was attached to Hephaestion likely due to his superior military experience. Perdiccas was part of the cavalry under Alexander's control at the Battle of the Hydaspes in 326 BC and crossed the river with him in said battle. Perdiccas later plundered around Sangala, and assaulted and sacked the Mallian towns. Alexander was wounded in this campaign, having been shot in the chest with an arrow that penetrated his armor; some traditions say Perdiccas was the one who cut the arrow out with a sword and saved the king's life.

In 324 BC, at the nuptials celebrated at Susa, a prominent Persian city, Perdiccas married the daughter of the Persian satrap of Media, Atropates. Perdiccas' wife's name is not known and he likely divorced her following Alexander's death. (Note: Historian Elizabeth Baynham argued that Perdiccas' Persian ex-wife may have remained in his entourage until his eventual death, potentially rejoining her father's household afterward.) When Hephaestion unexpectedly died the same year, Perdiccas was appointed his successor as commander of the Companion cavalry and chiliarch, effectively becoming Alexander's second-in-command. He was also entrusted with the responsibility of transferring Hephaestion's corpse to Babylon for burning and burial. As Alexander lay dying in his bed, he gave his signet ring to Perdiccas. Although Alexander's intention with this action is not clear, it is probable that he wanted Perdiccas to reign as regent until his children came of age.

== Succession and crisis ==
Following the death of Alexander the Great on 11 June 323 BC in Babylon, his generals met to discuss succession and next steps. Perdiccas was very influential at this point, as a close friend of Alexander, his second-in-command, the foremost of the generals, and also because he possessed the signet ring Alexander had given to him.

=== Debate for leadership ===
The debate around who would succeed Alexander led to a divide in the Macedonian army; on one side were the aristocratic cavalry officers (generals), and on the other side were the infantry soldiers. The infantry, also wanting to listen to the discussion, broke into the room where Perdiccas and the other generals were speaking. Perdiccas, having placed the ring he had received from Alexander on the throne, along with the royal robes and diadem, proposed that a final decision could wait until Alexander's wife Roxana, who was pregnant, had given birth. If the unborn child (the future Alexander IV of Macedon) was a boy, then Perdiccas proposed that the child be chosen as the new king.

This meant Perdiccas would be the regent and effectively the ruler of Alexander's empire until Roxana's unborn child was old enough to rule. Though his later actions would show Perdiccas had ambitions to be king, during the assembly, when Aristonous, a fellow bodyguard, proclaimed Perdiccas should be made king and the suggestion was met with significant approval, Perdiccas hesitated to accept the position, and the moment was lost. Another of Alexander's companions, Ptolemy, proposed a joint board of generals to rule the Empire, perhaps as a slight against Perdiccas as such a scheme would greatly decrease his current authority. Other proposals were considered, but despite misgivings amongst the other generals, most accepted Perdiccas' proposal of waiting until Roxana gave birth. The agreed upon interim arrangement was Perdiccas and Leonnatus overseeing Asia, and Craterus and Antipater ruling Macedonian-controlled Europe.

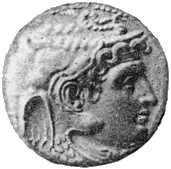
Coin of Alexander IV of Macedon. Despite the faith put in Roxana's child as a future king, it was not actually known, until his birth, that Alexander IV would be a boy

However, the infantry commander Meleager disagreed with Perdiccas' plans. Meleager argued in favour of Alexander's intellectually disabled half brother, Philip III Arrhidaeus, whom he considered first in succession. The infantry supported this proposal with Meleager's troops willing to fight in favour of Philip III, who they crowned. The infantry began to riot, and the generals united under Perdiccas' authority. After a brief scuffle, Perdiccas ordered a tactical retreat and the generals fled Babylon, but Perdiccas remained for a time hoping to regain the allegiance of the infantry. Meleager sent assassins to kill him. Despite only having page boys with him, Perdiccas met the assassins openly, and taunted and terrified them into fleeing.

=== Siege of Babylon ===
Perdiccas joined the generals outside of Babylon and put the city to siege, cutting off the supply lines. Meleager's powerbase began to diminish, and he was eventually convinced by Eumenes of Cardia, Alexander's former secretary, to reconcile with the generals, perhaps in collusion with Perdiccas. Perdiccas announced Philip III and the unborn child of Alexander's wife Roxana, the future Alexander IV of Macedon, would be recognised as joint kings to placate Meleager. While the general Craterus was officially declared "Guardian of the Royal Family", Perdiccas effectively held this position, as the joint kings were with him in Babylon. Antipater was confirmed as viceroy of Macedon and Greece. To formalize the reconciliation between the generals and infantry, Perdiccas announced a lustration (a religious purification ritual) and review of the army, convincing Meleager and the infantry to attend.

When the infantry accepted and marched outside Babylon, Perdiccas held a clear military advantage as he controlled all the cavalry and could threaten the infantry with a flanking maneuver. He then sent Philip III to order the capture of the rebellious leaders of the infantry, except for Meleager. Perdiccas had these 30 men (sometimes reported as 300) killed by having them trampled upon by his war elephants. Soon afterward, having cowed the infantry, Perdiccas had Meleager executed as well. Though successful in securing his supreme power again, the incident left the chiliarch and regent Perdiccas untrusting of the other generals, who were also suspicious of him now.

== Regent of Alexander's empire ==
Through the Partition of Babylon in 323 BC, a compromise was reached under which Perdiccas was to serve as the "Regent of the Empire" (epimelētēs) for the disabled Philip III and infant Alexander IV, as well as the supreme commander (strategos) of the imperial army. Perdiccas soon showed himself intolerant of rivals and, acting in the name of the two kings, sought to hold the empire together under his own hand. Perdiccas oversaw the distribution of satrapies to the other generals, sending away officers who threatened his authority. Perdiccas also attached Cleomenes of Naucratis to Ptolemy in Egypt as a lieutenant. Modern historians believe this was done to limit Ptolemy's power and keep a watch on his actions.

The men who remained at court with Perdiccas were probably those he could trust: his brother Alcetas, his brother-in-law Attalus, Seleucus, and Aristonous. Alexander the Great's second wife, Stateira, was murdered by Perdiccas, possibly at the urging of Roxana. Perdiccas also procured Alexander's "Last Plans" through the help of Eumenes, read the plans out before the army, and rejected them. This was done because not only were the plans extraordinarily expensive and grand (they included, for example, the conquest of all of North Africa and the powerful Carthaginian Empire, along with the construction of a fleet of a thousand warships), but also because Perdiccas probably did not want to anger Antipater by replacing him with Craterus. Alexander's wife Roxana gave birth (in the late summer or early fall of 323 BC) and Perdiccas assumed the guardianship of Alexander IV.

=== Rebellions and refusals ===
As his authority was unstable, possibly as early as the Siege of Babylon Perdiccas had negotiated a marriage with Nicaea of Macedon, the daughter of Antipater, to ally himself with the viceroy, acknowledging Antipater's rule in Europe while improving his own position in Asia.

==== Bactrian Greek revolt ====
During the winter of 323 BC in the Upper Satrapies, specifically in Bactria (in modern-day Afghanistan), a rebellion had begun consisting of 23,000 Greek mercenaries who had heard of Alexander's death and now wanted to return home. In response, Perdiccas tasked Peithon, another of Alexander's somatophylakes and satrap of Media, with quelling it, and sent orders for the eastern satraps to contribute troops as well. Peithon marched east leading 3,800 men, with 10,000 to come from the eastern satraps. Although ancient sources suggest Peithon intended to recruit the Greeks and betray Perdiccas, modern historians dispute this. When the armies met, the Greeks surrendered and were partially slaughtered by Peithon's army. Perdiccas' motive in this affair is not clear; some traditions say he gave the order for the massacre in order to ensure Peithon did not gain an army or to punish the rebels, while another hypothesis is that the slaughter of the Greeks may have occurred through the actions of Peithon and was later blamed on Perdiccas.

==== Conquest of Cappadocia ====
Despite success in the east, Perdiccas' authority as regent was then challenged in the west. Here, Perdiccas had appointed Leonnatus, another somatophylax, as satrap of Hellespontine Phrygia on the western coast of Asia Minor. At the Partition of Babylon, Perdiccas' supporter Eumenes was given the satrapies of Cappadocia and Paphlagonia, but both were unconquered. Perdiccas thus used his authority as regent of the joint kings to order Leonnatus and Antigonus (satrap of Phrygia, Pamphylia and Lycia) to aid Eumenes in securing his satrapy. Perdiccas probably gave Eumenes 5000 talents of gold for the reconquest of Cappadocia, allowing Eumenes to hire mercenaries.

Map of Anatolia, also called Asia Minor, and its regions. Perdiccas moved into Cappadocia, then Cilicia, and then Pisidia in his successful restabilizing of the peninsula.

Antigonus refused Perdiccas' order. Leonnatus accepted, mustering an army and marching to Cappadocia, arriving in the spring of 322 BC. Leonnatus, however, received a letter from Macedon from Cleopatra, Alexander the Great's full sister, and Antipater, both asking him to come west. Cleopatra, probably influenced by her mother Olympias, offered herself as Leonnatus' bride, which would give Leonnatus claim to the Macedonian throne. Meanwhile Antipater asked Leonnatus for urgent assistance, as the former was besieged at Lamia by the Greeks led by Leosthenes, who were rebelling against Macedon in the Lamian War. Leonnatus told Eumenes of his plan to head west, attempting to convince him to join; Eumenes refused and departed to Perdiccas' court, informing him of Leonnatus' intentions. For this information, Perdiccas elevated Eumenes to the ruling council of the Empire. This incident may have been what made Perdiccas "regard Cleopatra as a means of gaining supreme power".

Upon learning of Leonnatus' departure, in the early summer of 322 BC Perdiccas marched with the imperial army towards Asia Minor to reassert his dominance as regent, install Eumenes in Cappadocia, and confront Antigonus. It also allowed him to "complete the conquest of Alexander's empire" as Alexander had ignored Cappadocia. In a single campaigning season, Perdiccas defeated the Achaemenid satrap of Cappadocia Ariarathes I and his large army (30,000 infantry, 15,000 cavalry) in two decisive pitched battles, capturing more than 5,000 soldiers and killing 4,000 others, allowing his supporter Eumenes to claim his satrapy. This greatly contributed to Perdiccas' prestige; Perdiccas took Ariarathes captive, tortured and killed him, and apparently impaled most of his family. Perdiccas ordered Leonnatus to appear before him to stand trial for disobedience, but Leonnatus died during the Lamian War before the order reached him. At some time during the first year of his reign, Perdiccas crowned Alexander IV as king alongside Philip III.

==== Conquest of Pisidia, Isauria, Larandia ====
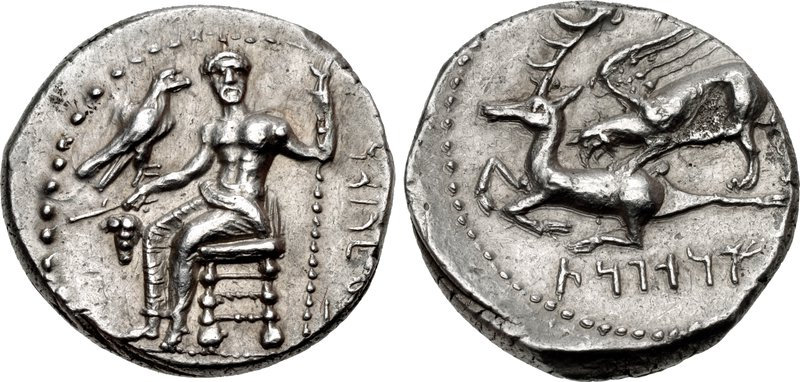
Coin of Ariarathes I, minted in Gaziura, dated 333–322 BC. Perdiccas' defeat and execution of the 82 year old Ariarathes, along with his other conquests in Asia Minor, brought him to the height of his power.

Having settled Cappadocia, Perdiccas planned to send Eumenes to subdue the Satrapy of Armenia, which was being mismanaged by Neoptolemus. He marched with Eumenes to Cilicia in the autumn of 322 BC and added the formidable and elite Macedonian Silver Shields. The Silver Shields were some of the oldest and most experienced veterans of Alexander's conquests. Perdiccas then gave Eumenes his orders, and marched to Pisidia. The native Isaurians and Larandians living here had revolted, murdering Alexander's satrap. Perdiccas campaigned against them next, easily conquering and destroying their cities in "short and brutal struggles", acquiring great amounts of plunder and prestige; "Victorious in the field ... Perdiccas now enjoyed his greatest success".

=== Marriage and war ===
To strengthen his control over the empire when his authority was weak, Perdiccas had agreed to marry Nicaea, the daughter of Antipater, the regent of Macedon. But now, in the winter of 322–321 BC, with his position greatly strengthened, Perdiccas was reconsidering the engagement. Furthermore, Olympias, the mother of Alexander the Great, offered him the hand of Cleopatra of Macedon, who was residing at Sardis. Eumenes urged Perdiccas to marry Cleopatra, while Perdiccas' brother Alcetas advised marriage to Nicaea. Alcetas' faction believed that Perdiccas, in control of the royals, imperial army, and treasuries, could afford to wait for Antipater's death (he was very old) instead of incurring his wrath; Eumenes' faction argued Perdiccas ought to begin to formally rule and that the dual kingship of Philip III and Alexander IV was a sham.

Rejecting Nicaea here would begin war with Antipater; as Perdiccas had yet to deal with Antigonus, he married Nicaea for the time being. During this winter, Antipater, having subdued Athens in the Lamian War, deferred the decision regarding the Samian exiles to Perdiccas; they were allowed to return to Samos on Perdiccas' order.

==== Bid for kingship ====
Perdiccas decided that he wished to win the Macedonian throne, and had designed a plan for this; marriage to Cleopatra, and the return of Alexander's body, his son (Alexander IV), and his brother (Philip III) to Macedonia with Olympias' approval which, combined, would have made him "invincible" and virtually guaranteed the kingship. Given the intellectual disability of Philip III and the limited acceptance of the infant Alexander IV due to his mother being a Persian, the marriage in particular would have given Perdiccas a claim as Alexander's true successor as king, not merely as regent. Feeling "full of confidence and well able to handle all his rivals," Perdiccas set about planning his march on Macedon. At this time he also responded to communications from the Athenian orator Demades and the Aetolian League, plotting with them secretly to depose Antipater.

Around this time, Cynane, Alexander's half-sister and widow of the Macedonian King Amyntas IV, arranged for her daughter, Eurydice II, to marry Philip III. Perdiccas, knowing this marriage would undermine his control over Philip III, sent an army under his brother Alcetas to order Cynane to return to Macedon. Cynane refused, and Alcetas' army killed her. Whether Perdiccas ordered this killing or not is debated, but it initiated a reversal of his ascendancy; "His officers grew increasingly suspicious of his aspirations, the common soldier was alienated by his acts of barbarity". Perdiccas' army was furious at Cynane's murder and effectively mutinied. This widespread discontent compelled Perdiccas to spare Eurydice II and marry her to Philip III after all, eroding his control over the royal family. Though Perdiccas was able to regain overall control, this incident seems to have demonstrated to him that "the marriage to Cleopatra, despite the risks involved, was essential if the empire was to remain intact". Eumenes, accordingly, was sent by Perdiccas to Cleopatra with gifts to discuss marriage once again, and plans were set in place for the marriage to go forward.

Perdiccas had, in the meantime, ordered Antigonus to stand trial for insubordination (failing to help Eumenes in Cappadocia) and other charges. Antigonus was an entrenched and powerful satrap in Asia Minor; his refusal of Perdiccas' order undermined the authority of his government and Perdiccas wanted to rectify this. In response, Antigonus, fearing confrontation with the regent, fled to Antipater's court in Macedon, bringing news of not only Perdiccas' murder of Cynane, but his kingly aspirations and intention to marry Cleopatra instead of Nicaea. Craterus and Antipater, having subdued most of Greece in the Lamian War, were infuriated by Antigonus' news and Perdiccas' ambitions. They suspended their plans for more campaigns in Greece and prepared to march into Asia and depose Perdiccas, beginning the First War of the Diadochi.

== Civil war and invasion of Egypt ==
=== Theft of the body of Alexander the Great ===
In late 321 and early 320 BC, as part of his kingly aspirations, Perdiccas intended to send Alexander's body back to Aegae in Macedonia, the traditional place of burial for the royal family. The officer Arrhidaeus (not the king) was chosen to escort the body back to Macedonia, having constructed an elaborate funeral carriage. Perdiccas had informed Arrhidaeus of his plans, but Arrhidaeus began conveying Alexander's body to Egypt instead of Macedon, and met no resistance as he did so. Ptolemy, who had already come to an understanding with Antipater and Craterus, had probably colluded with Arrhidaeus and Archon, satrap of Babylon in order to have Alexander's body go to Egypt. Perdiccas, enraged by this news, sent an army to recover the body, but Ptolemy defeated this force and successfully brought Alexander's remains back to Egypt, where they were housed in the city of Memphis.

Since the Partition of Babylon, Ptolemy had conquered Cyrenaica without Perdiccas' approval, and within a year of gaining his satrapy had unlawfully executed Cleomenes, the officer Perdiccas had attached to him. Perdiccas, who already distrusted Ptolemy, regarded his diversion of Alexander's body as an unacceptable provocation, "an act of war", and after convening his officers decided to invade Egypt.

=== Campaign against Ptolemy ===
Perdiccas' strategy was for his supporters to hold Asia Minor against Antipater and Craterus while he brought the royal army and the kings Philip III and Alexander IV south to eliminate Ptolemy. Perdiccas gave Eumenes of Cardia supreme command (as autokrator) to hold the Hellespont, and ordered Alcetas and Neoptolemus to obey Eumenes. Cleitus the White was ordered to aid Eumenes in the maritime domain. Perdiccas probably expected to be able to defeat Ptolemy and then turn to combat Antipater and Craterus. Before Perdiccas left Pisidia, he attempted once more to entreat Cleopatra of Macedon to marry him, now needing the increased authority the marriage would bring, but she refused, not knowing who would win the war to come. Perdiccas marched to Cilicia first, deposing the satrap Philotas due to his friendship with Craterus, replacing him with Philoxenus.

He prepared a fleet there while sending Docimus to Babylon to supplant the satrap Archon for collusion with Ptolemy. Perdiccas also prepared another fleet, led by Sosigenes of Rhodes and Aristonous, to conquer Cyprus and the Cypriot kings who had allied themselves to Ptolemy. As he was heading south, Perdiccas, having heard that Alcetas and Neoptolemus were refusing to work under Eumenes, ordered them once again to subordinate themselves to him. Finally, a third fleet led by Attalus, his brother-in-law, carried Perdiccas' sister Atalante and shadowed Perdiccas' army on their southward march. Docimus conquered Babylon and killed Archon in battle, while Perdiccas reached Damascus and deposed Laomedon, satrap of Syria for sympathizing with Ptolemy. Soon after arriving in Egypt, Perdiccas may have heard of Eumenes' victory over Neoptolemus, who had defected to Antipater and Craterus. With this boost in morale, and when further reinforcements joined him, Perdiccas marched towards the Nile.

==== Fording of the Nile and the Camel's Rampart ====
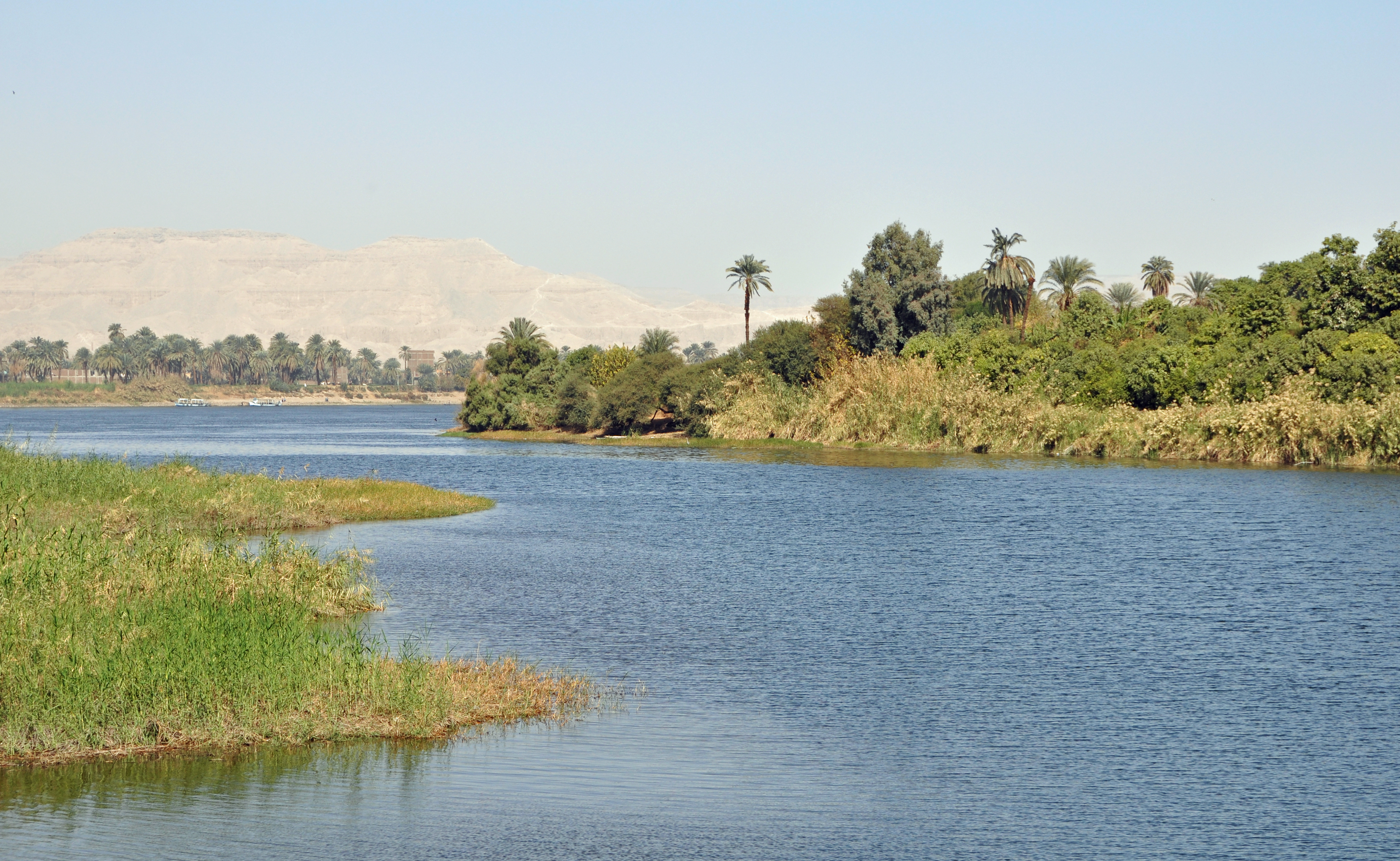
The Nile river. A famously difficult river to forcibly cross throughout history, Perdiccas' attempt ultimately failed due to faulty execution, bad timing, and determined resistance from Ptolemy's armies.

Ptolemy had been fortifying his satrapy for two years, believing war with Perdiccas was highly likely, and this greatly contributed to Perdiccas' difficulties and ultimate defeat. Ptolemy directed his efforts to preventing an open pitched battle between him and Perdiccas.

Perdiccas reached the most easterly tributary of the Nile near Pelusium, and discovered the opposite side was garrisoned. He had his troops construct a dam, probably intending to lower the water levels to ease a crossing, but the force of the river broke it apart. It is possible that Perdiccas' invasion occurred while the Nile was flooding. In any case, the destruction of the dam led some officers in Perdiccas' camp to defect; Perdiccas, in response, successfully inspired his army with gifts and titles to continue the war effort.

Perdiccas then decamped, not informing his soldiers where he intended to march. He travelled swiftly upstream to find a suitable point to cross, soon coming across a ford which led to the cities of Tanis and Avaris on the other side of the Nile. However, a fort known as the 'Camel's Rampart' (Kamelon Teichos) inhibited his advance. Perdiccas then ordered his army to attack, leading an assault on the fortress at dawn. Perdiccas deployed his war elephants first, then the hypaspists and Silver Shields, leading the cavalry in the rear in case Ptolemy arrived. When a large army under Ptolemy then arrived to reinforce the fort, denying Perdiccas an easy victory, Perdiccas, undaunted, renewed the assault. His infantry attempted to escalade the walls while his elephants destroyed Ptolemy's defenses. The fighting continued inconclusively for a considerable amount of time, with heavy losses for both sides, before Perdiccas finally broke off the siege and marched back to his camp.

That same night, Perdiccas broke camp again and marched to another ford, this one near Memphis. Here, Perdiccas placed his elephants upstream of this new crossing to block the currents that would otherwise sweep away his men and his cavalry downstream, and also to catch any soldiers unlucky enough to be swept away regardless of the elephants' makeshift dam.

For a time this strategy worked, enabling a sizeable contingent of Perdiccas's army to cross the river and reach an island at its center. Many drowned in the attempt, however, and soon the elephants began to sink in the mud of the riverbed, disturbing the bottom and quickly inflating the currents. This proved to be a disaster for Perdiccas, as he had to abandon the crossing, leaving many of his infantry stranded on the island. Perdiccas recalled the soldiers, but most of this contingent drowned trying to make it back to the eastern bank, many being eaten by crocodiles. Perdiccas' losses totaled 2,000, including prominent officers.

=== Assassination ===
Following what was so far a disastrous campaign, a mutiny broke out amongst Perdiccas' soldiers, who were disheartened by his failure to make progress in Egypt. Angry at his failure and very likely colluding with Ptolemy, Perdiccas was murdered in his tent by his officers Peithon, Antigenes, and Seleucus; probably in the summer of 320 BC, roughly three years after he had assumed the regency. His officers and the rest of his army defected to Ptolemy, who rode into his camp the following day. Perdiccas' regency and guardianship over the kings was then jointly assumed by Peithon and Arrhidaeus (the officer) shortly before the Partition of Triparadisus, where Antipater then gained the title.

News of Eumenes' victory at the Battle of the Hellespont in 320 BC where Craterus and Neoptolemus were killed, which would have instantly restored Perdiccas' authority, arrived in Egypt one day after his assassination. Historian Edward Anson notes that "if the news of Eumenes' victory over Craterus had arrived sooner, the entire history of the post-Alexander era might have been dramatically altered; Perdiccas might have emerged supreme, the successor of Alexander and the ruler of the vast Macedonian empire, with the inauguration of a new royal family". What became of Alexander's signet ring that Perdiccas carried, and even whether he brought it into Egypt, is not known.

== Legacy ==
=== Character ===
The ancient accounts are largely negative toward Perdiccas, claiming that, though "outstanding on the battlefield", he was arrogant, high-handed, and imperious. Diodorus Siculus calls him phonikos (φονικός), a "man of slaughter". Perdiccas' "autocratic savagery" is contrasted in these sources with Ptolemy's "moderation and magnanimity". This may be due to the "surpassing rivalry" and enmity between Perdiccas and Ptolemy, whose now lost account served as the basis for the surviving sources (chiefly Arrian) we have for Perdiccas' career. The other characteristic regularly ascribed to Perdiccas by ancient sources is boldness.

Although Perdiccas was evidently a capable leader and effective soldier, a "military man", he is seen to have lacked the qualities his position as regent required. His rule was authoritarian and abrasive, winning him little love from the rank and file, and his punishments were often brutal. Anson believes Perdiccas "was not a man to be crossed" and that "most acceded to his demands in his presence rather than incur his wrath". Conversely, historian James Romm writes that "When a leader has failed, the very qualities that made him a leader suddenly appear as flaws. Perdiccas' arrogance and bloody-mindedness were no more pronounced than Alexander's ... but Alexander, unlike the hapless Perdiccas, knew little of failure". Heckel argues that Perdiccas was "undeniably more accomplished" than Ptolemy by the time of Alexander's death, with his faults "doubtless[ly] exaggerated by his political enemies".

=== Political legacy and motives ===
Perdiccas' death and the transfer of the regency to Antipater has been seen as marking the end "for the empire as Alexander had envisioned it", as Perdiccas was not only quite close to Alexander but, like Alexander, had chosen to centre the empire at Babylon. Classicist Robin Waterfield believes that since Perdiccas represented direct succession from Alexander himself, his assassination was a "momentous step".

Perdiccas' motives are debated, though he is typically held to have acted from ambition. Some, such as Romm, believe he may have acted out of a desire to protect Alexander IV and maintain the unity of Alexander's empire. Anson disbelieves this, citing Perdiccas' duplicitous communications with the Aetolian League against Antipater. Whether for ambition or loyalty, it is agreed that Perdiccas sought to "hold Alexander's legacy intact". The historian W. W. Tarn wrote that "Perdiccas ... was a brave and good soldier; he was probably loyal to Alexander's house, and meant to keep the empire together; but he saw that someone must exercise power, and he meant it to be himself". The regime that succeeded Perdiccas following the Partition of Triparadisus lasted only a few years, shorter than Perdiccas' regency.

Historian Waldemar Heckel's view is that "Perdiccas' career is an unfortunate tale of lofty ideals combined with excessive ambition and political myopia", but also that Perdiccas' attempts at keeping Alexander's empire united are "to be admired" and "suggests that he understood Alexander's policies". In summary, Heckel says he was "a great but flawed man, a victim of his own success and the envy of others".

== Bibliography ==
=== Ancient sources ===
- Arrian. The Anabasis of Alexander – via gutenberg.org.
- Plutarch (1919) [2nd century AD]. "Life of Eumenes". Parallel Lives. Loeb Classical Library. Vol. 8. Translated by Perrin, Bernadotte. OCLC 40115288 – via LacusCurtius.
- Diodorus (1947) [1st century BC]. "Books 17, 18, 19". Library of History. Loeb Classical Library. Vol. 9. Translated by Perrin, Bernadotte – via LacusCurtius.
- Cornelius Nepos (1929). Excellentium imperatorum vitae (De Viris Illustribus). Translated by Rolfe, J.C. – via Attalus.org.
- Photius. "92. [Arrian, Continuation]". Bibliotheca or Myrobiblion – via tertullian.org.
- Justinus (1853). "Book 13-14". Epitome of Pompeius Trogus' Philippic Histories. Translated by Watson, J.S. – via Attalus.org.

=== Modern sources ===
- Anson, Edward M. (2014). Alexander's Heirs: The Age of the Successors. John Wiley & Sons. ISBN 9781444339628.
- Anson, Edward M. (2015). Eumenes of Cardia: a Greek among Macedonians. Vol. 383 (2nd ed.). Brill. ISBN 978-9004297159.
- Atkinson, J. E.; Yardley, J. C. (2009). Curtius Rufus: Histories of Alexander the Great, Book 10 (2nd ed.). Oxford University Press. ISBN 9780199557622.
- Austin, M. M. (1994). The Hellenistic World from Alexander to the Roman Conquest: a Selection of Ancient Sources in Translation. Cambridge University Press. ISBN 0-521-29666-8.
- Badian, Ernst (2012). Collected Papers on Alexander the Great. Routledge. ISBN 9780203125267.
- Bosworth, A. B. (2005). The Legacy of Alexander: Politics, Warfare, and Propaganda under the Successors. Oxford University Press. ISBN 9780198153061.
- Baynham, Elizabeth (2022). "Bosworth on Alexander and the Iranians Revisted: Alexander's Marriages to Persian Brides at Susa: A Study of Arrian, Anabasis 7.4.4-8". In Frances Pownall; Sulochana R. Asirvatham; Sabine Müller (eds.). The Courts of Philip II and Alexander the Great: Monarchy and Power in Ancient Macedonia. Walter de Gruyter. pp. 149–168. ISBN 978-3-11-062240-9.
- Demandt, Alexander (2013) [1st pub. 2009]. Alexander der Grosse. Leben und Legende [Alexander the Great. Life and Legend] (in German) (Anniversary ed.). C.H. Beck. ISBN 978-3-406-64431-3.
- Green, Peter (1990). Alexander to Actium. University of California Press. pp. 3–15. ISBN 0-520-05611-6.
- Heckel, Waldemar (2006). Who's Who in the Age of Alexander the Great: Prosopography of Alexander's Empire. Blackwell Publishing. ISBN 9781405112109.
- Heckel, Waldemar (2016). Alexander's Marshals: A Study of the Makedonian Aristocracy and the Politics of Military Leadership. Routledge, Taylor & Francis. ISBN 9781138934696.
- Heckel, Waldemar (2022). "Storm Clouds over the Three Hellenistic Courts: Observations on the Life and Death of Ptolemy Ceraunus". In Frances Pownall; Sulochana R. Asirvatham; Sabine Müller (eds.). The Courts of Philip II and Alexander the Great: Monarchy and Power in Ancient Macedonia. Walter de Gruyter. pp. 33–56. ISBN 978-3-11-062240-9.
- Hughes, Tristan (2022). The Perdiccas Years, 323–320 BC. Pen & Sword Military. ISBN 978-1-52677-511-5.
- Roisman, Joseph (2012). Alexander's Veterans and the Early Wars of the Successors. University of Texas Press. ISBN 9780292735965.
- Romm, James (2011). Ghost on the Throne. Alfred A. Knoff: Random House. ISBN 9780307701503.
- Rowson, Alex (2022). The Young Alexander: The Making of Alexander the Great. London: William Collins. ISBN 978-0-00-828439-8.
- Waterfield, Robin (2011). Dividing the Spoils. Oxford University Press. ISBN 9780195395235.

Political offices
Preceded by Alexander III as King	Regent of Macedon; 323–320 BC	Succeeded by Peithon and Arrhidaeus
