= Battle of Paraitakene =

317 BC battle of the Second War of the Diadochi

Coordinates: 32.6333°N 51.6500°E

- Part of the Second War of the Diadochi
Date	317 BC
Location	Paraitakene (near modern Isfahan, Iran)
Result	Eumenes victory

Belligerents
Enemies of Polyperchon	Supporters of Polyperchon

Commanders and leaders
Antigonos; Demetrios; Peithon	Eumenes; Eudemos; Peukestas; Antigenes; Teutamos

Strength
c. 44,000 total; 28,000 heavy infantry; 5,500 light infantry; 6,900 light cavalry; 3,700 heavy cavalry; 65 war elephants	c. 41,000 total; 17,000 heavy infantry; 18,000 light infantry; 6,300 cavalry; 125 war elephants

Casualties and losses
7,700, inc. 3,700 killed	1,540, inc. 540 killed
- Approximate location of the Battle of Paraitakene.

The Battle of Paraitakene (also called Paraetacene; Greek: Παραιτακηνή) was fought in 317 BC, during the second of the succession wars that were fought after the death of Alexander the Great; the so called Wars of the Diadochi. In Paraitakene, a district of Persis, the armies of Antigonus Monophthalmus and Eumenes the Cardian engaged in a long and bloody battle that ended indecisively; since Antigonus suffered the most casualties the battle is seen as a victory for Eumenes. Both armies withdrew after the battle; Antigonus towards his ally Peithon's satrapy of Media, Eumenes towards Gabiene.

== Background ==
After the death of Alexander the Great, his generals immediately began squabbling over his huge empire. Soon it degenerated into open warfare, with each general attempting to claim a portion of Alexander's vast kingdom. One of the most talented successor generals (Diadochi) was Antigonus Monophthalmus, so called because of an eye he lost in a siege. During the early years of warfare between the Diadochi, he faced Eumenes, a capable general who had already crushed the popular general Craterus. The two Diadochi fought a series of battles across Asia Minor in which Antigonos completely outgeneraled Eumenes. Eumenes retreated to, and was besieged in, the fortress of Nora. Eventually, after swearing an oath, Eumenes was released. Unfortunately for Antigonos Eumenes had revised the original oath in a way he was still able to continue the war without being labeled an oathbreaker. Eumenes recruited a small army and marched south into Cilicia where he made an alliance with Antigenes and Teutamus (commanders of the Argyraspides (Silver Shields) and the Hypaspists (Shield-bearers), two corps of veterans of Alexander the Great's wars of conquest). In Cilicia, Syria and Phoenicia Eumenes recruited additional troops for his army and ships for his fleet and renewed the war against Antigonos. Antigonos, having taken care of his enemies in the West, now marched East after Eumenes. When he arrived in Cilicia he found out Eumenes had marched to Mesopotamia trying to get the eastern Satraps to join his cause. After securing Cilicia and Syria he marched to Mesopotamia intent upon bringing Eumenes to battle. Eumenes avoided battle and the armies marched and countermarched through Babylonia, Susiana and Media until finally, in the summer of 316 BC, they faced off across a plain in the lands of the Paraitakenoi, to the northeast of Susa.

== Prelude ==
In the summer of 316 BC, Antigonus moved southward from Media towards Persia in the hope of forcing Eumenes to battle. Eumenes was moving north from Persia. The two armies met in the region called Paraitakene, between Media and Persia. Antigonus drew up his army in a strong defensive position. The two armies surveyed each other for a while, and for four days they lived off the land. On the fifth day, supplies were running low so Antigonus decided to march away to Gabiene, where the countryside was rich and unplundered. Unfortunately his plans were betrayed by some deserters, and Eumenes was able to march off first. When Antigonus found out his opponent had left he gave chase with his cavalry while the rest of his army followed at moderate speed. In this way he caught up with Eumenes's rearguard and forced him to halt his army. When the rest of Antigonus's army came up both sides prepared for battle.

== Opposing forces ==
Antigonus' army consisted of 28,000 heavy infantry, 5,500 light infantry, 3,700 heavy cavalry, 6,900 light cavalry and 65 war elephants. His heavy infantry was made up of 8,000 Macedonians, 8,000 Pantodapoi, 3,000 Lycians and Phamphylians and 9,000 Greeks mercenaries; the light infantry is not specified; the cavalry consisted of 1,800–2,400 Macedonians (Note: According to historian Richard A. Billows: 300 agema, 1,000 hetairoi, 400 asthipoi, 400 katoikoi and 300 paides – the hetairoi, asthiphoi and kathoikoi are Macedonian units, Antigonus' agema and the paides (pages) would probably have contained a large number of Macedonians (at least half).), 1,000 Lydians and Phrygians, 1,000 Medians and Parthians, 1,000 Thracians, 1,500 cavalry brought by his ally Peithon, 500 allied Greeks, 500 unspecified mercenaries, 2,200 Tarentines (Note: A light type of light cavalry who threw javelines.), 400 unspecified lancers, and 300 pages.

Eumenes'army consisted of 17,000 heavy infantry, 18,000 light infantry, 6,300 cavalry and 125 elephants. The army's most important element were its core of veterans from Alexander the Great's army; the 3,000 Argyraspides (Silver Shields) and the 3,000 Hypaspists (Shield-Bearers).

== Battle ==
Antigonus deployed his army obliquely, the right wing leading, in the same fashion used by Alexander and Philip. Antigonus deployed his light horse (c. 7,000 horsemen) on the left under Peithon, his heavy cavalry (3,700 horsemen) and light infantry were placed on the right flank resting on the hills under his own command and his phalanx held the center, with the Macedonians on the right, the Asians in the center and the mercenaries (probably Greeks) on the left, while the war elephants were spread across the line. Eumenes, also placed his phalanx in the center, with the elite Argyraspides and Hypaspists on the right of the phalanx. His left flank, resting near the hill, was made up of cavalry, elephants, and auxiliaries. The right flank was led by Eumenes himself with his heavy cavalry (2,900 horsemen). Antigonus's oldest son Demetrius, aged about twenty, was with his father commanding the heavy cavalry on the right and making his major combat debut.

The battle began with Peithon, ignoring his orders to hang back, charging Eumenes's heavy cavalry with his more numerous light cavalry. Eumenes held his own against Peithon with his heavy cavalry and elephants and then attacked him in the flank with a couple of his own light cavalry squadrons brought over from his left flank. Peithon was driven back to the foothills in rout.

In the center, the two phalanxes engaged, again to Eumenes’ advantage due to the incredible skill of the Argyraspides who, despite their age (50 to 70 years old), seemed invincible. Antigonus's phalanx was also driven back to the foothills.

Despite these reverses, Antigonus kept his head and when he observed that the very success of the enemy phalanx had led them forward opening up a gap between their center and their left flank he charged his heavy cavalry into this gap, wheeling right and left to the rear of Eumenes's cavalry and his phalanx. The attack proved successful – ending what seemed to be the start of a Eumenes victory over another opponent. The battle slowed as both sides tried to rally broken units. Eumenes tried to claim victory by occupying the battlefield but his troops insisted on returning to their baggage and making camp there. Antigonos, who had his troops better in hand, marched forward and claimed the battlefield.

== Aftermath ==
Antigonus claimed victory, even though he lost some 3,700 men, and a further 4,000 were wounded. Eumenes came off with a loss of only 540 men and some 1,000 injured. Antigonos used trickery (force marching his army away by night) to get away from Eumenes, but he would be back the following year. Their next major confrontation would be the Battle of Gabiene.
