= Battle of Gabiene =

315 BCE land battle of the Second War of the Diadochi

- Part of the Second War of the Diadochi
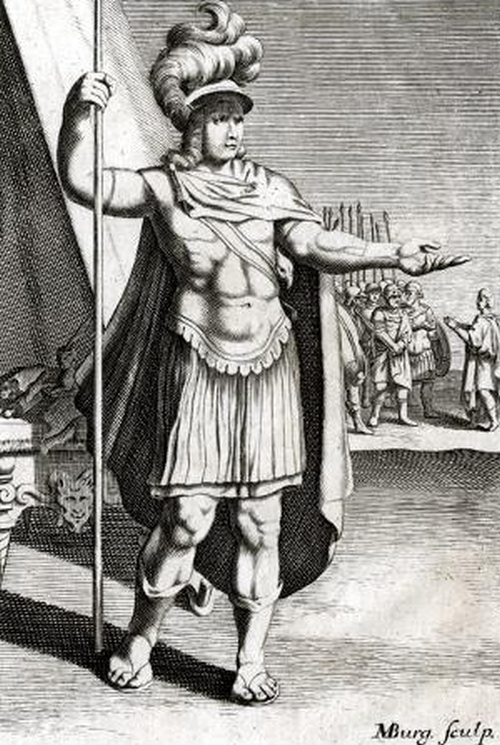
- Eumenes of Cardia; Late 17th century print.
Date	Winter of 316–315 BC
Location	Gabiene (Isfahan province, Iran) 31.777205°N 51.801649°E
Result	Inconclusive, Antigonid overall victory when Eumenes betrayed after battle

Belligerents
Enemies of Polyperchon	Supporters of Polyperchon

Commanders and leaders
Antigonos; Demetrios; Peithon	Eumenes (executed); Eudemos (executed); Peukestas; Antigenes (executed); Teutamos

Strength
Unknown total; 22,000 infantry; 9,000 cavalry; 65 elephants	c. 43,000 total; 36,700 infantry; 6,000 cavalry; 114 elephants

Casualties and losses
About 5,000	300
- Approximate location of the Battle of Gabiene. Battle of Gabiene (Iran)

Battle of Gabiene was the second great battle (Note: the third battle in total – see: the battles of Orkynia and Paraitakene) between Antigonus Monophthalmus and Eumenes, two of Alexander the Great's successors (the so-called Diadochi). The battle was fought near Gabiene in Persia in the winter of 316-315 BC and ended the Second War of the Diadochi. It established Antigonus as the most powerful of the successors.

Since the sole reference of this battle is ultimately from Eumenes' personal aide Hieronymus of Cardia (later transmitted through the historian Diodorus), who later switched his allegiance to Antigonus, he provides a unique perspective from both sides' point of view.

== Background ==
After the death of Alexander the Great in 323 BC, his generals immediately began squabbling over his empire. Soon it degenerated into open warfare, with each general attempting to claim a portion of Alexander's vast kingdom. One of the most talented generals among the Diadochi was Antigonus Monophthalmus (Antigonus the One-eyed), so called because of an eye he lost in a siege. During the early years of warfare between the Successors, he faced Eumenes, a capable general who had already crushed Craterus. The two Diadochi fought a series of actions across Asia Minor, and Persia and Media before finally meeting in what was to be a decisive battle at Gabiene (Greek: Γαβιηνή).

Antigonus had been a general for Philip II of Macedon and after his assassination for his son Alexander. Skilled and experienced in war, he had proved himself in many battles. Eumenes was not of Macedonian origin, unlike the rest of Diadochi. He had first been Philip's then Alexander's secretary, but Alexander seemed to have recognized a military talent in Eumenes, and gave him several senior commands in the campaign in India. After Alexander's death, Eumenes quickly showed his skill, allying himself with Perdiccas and winning over much of Anatolia.

In 319 BC, Antigonus marched his army into Cappadocia (Eumenes's satrapy) and in a lightning campaign (see: battle of Orkynia) drove Eumenes to Nora, a strong fortress on the border between Cappadocia and Lycaonia. Here Eumenes held out for more than a year until the death of Antipater threw his opponents into disarray. He escaped from Nora through trickery, allied himself with Polyperchon (the new Regent of the Empire) and, after gathering a small army, he marched into Cilicia where he made an alliance with Antigenes and Teutamos, the commanders of the Macedonian Silver Shields and the Hypaspists. Eventually Eumenes secured control over these men by playing on their loyalty to, and superstitious awe of, Alexander. He used the royal treasury at Kyinda to recruit an army of mercenaries to add to his own troops and the Macedonians of Antigenes and Teutamos. In 317 BC, Eumenes left Cilicia and marched into Syria and Phoenicia, and began to raise a naval force on behalf of Polyperchon. When it was ready he sent the fleet west to reinforce Polyperchon, but off the coast of Cilicia it was met by Antigonus's fleet and changed sides. Meanwhile, Antigonus had settled his affairs in Asia Minor and marched east to take out Eumenes before he could do further damage. Eumenes somehow had advance knowledge of this and marched out of Phoenica, through Syria into Mesopotamia, with the idea of gathering support in the upper satrapies. When Antigonus arrived in Syria, he found out Eumenes had left his base in Phoenica and had marched into the east. They marched and counter-marched through Mesopotamia, Babylonia, Susiana and Media until the two armies finally met in southern Media and fought the indecisive Battle of Paraitakene. Antigonus, whose casualties were more numerous, force marched his army to safety the next night.

== Prelude ==
During the winter of 316-315 BC, Antigonus tried to surprise Eumenes in Persia by marching his army across a desert to try and catch his enemy off guard. Unfortunately he was observed by some locals who reported it to his opponents. Eumenes then tricked Antigonus in believing he had his entire army with him. He gathered together a body of troops and, marking out on the hills a large camp, he had each soldier tend a campfire during the night giving the impression that a large army encamped there. Antigonus gave up his plan and awaited the rest of his army. A few days later, the armies drew together and encamped opposite of each other about five miles apart. They were on a broad plain, entirely uncultivated because of the loose and salty soil.

== Opposing forces ==
Antigonus' strength at this battle was 22,000 heavy infantry, an unknown number of light infantry, 9,000 cavalry and 65 war elephants. His heavy infantry was made up of at least 7,000 Macedonians, 6,500 Pantodapoi, 2,000 Lycians and Phamphylians and 6,500 Greek mercenaries; the light infantry is not specified; the cavalry is also not specified but numbered around 9,000 heavy and light cavalry.

Eumenes' army amounted of 36,700 infantry (both heavy and light), 6,000 cavalry and 114 elephants. The army's most important element were its core of veterans from Alexander the Great's army; the 3,000 Argyraspides (Silver Shields) and the 3,000 Hypaspists (Shield-Bearers).

== Battle ==
Antigonus, having a superiority in cavalry, resolved to mass his heavy cavalry and most of his elephants and light infantry on his right and strike against Eumenes's left flank, while refusing his center (infantry) and left (light horse). Antigonus and his son Demetrius commanded the heavy cavalry themselves. Eumenes, having seen Antigonus' deployment, placed himself and his best cavalry opposite Antigonus' heavy cavalry along with his own elephants and light infantry. He intended to hold Antigonus's charge while using his elite Argyraspides (the Silver Shields) phalanx to win in the center. The Argyraspides were a unit of veterans who had fought under Philip and then Alexander. Despite the fact that these battle-hardened veterans were old enough to be their opponents' grandfathers, they were still highly respected and thought to be invincible in combat.

Disposition of troops at the Battle of Gabiene.

Before the battle opened, Antigenes, the leader of the Argyraspides, sent a horseman over to Antigonus' phalanx heckling them, "Wicked men, are you sinning against your fathers, who conquered the whole world under Philip and Alexander?". The morale of Antigonus' phalangites sank and the phalanx of Eumenes raised a great cheer in response. Eumenes saw an opportunity and began advancing.

The skirmishers and elephants were the first to engage. At once a great cloud of dust was raised from the loose soil, obscuring most of the action. Antigonus observed this and decided to take advantage of it. He selected a body of Median and Tarentine light cavalry and ordered them to ride around Eumenes's left flank and attack his camp; they were to seize his baggage train and carry it back to Antigonus's camp. Because of the dust, this action went entirely unnoticed by Eumenes's army. Finding the enemy camp inadequately guarded, Antigonus's men captured and carried off most of their opponents baggage train, containing the wives, children, servants, and accumulated savings of the army.

Battle of Gabiene.

Battle of Gabiene, last mouvement.

On the right flank, using the thick dust to cover his movements, Antigonus and Demetrius rode with their heavy cavalry around the engaged skirmishers and elephants to unexpectedly hit Eumenes's horse on their flank. Taken by surprise a great part of Eumenes's heavy cavalry under Peucestas routed. Despite Eumenes's heroic efforts to drive off the Antigonids, he was seriously outnumbered and was driven back. Antigonus and Demetrius used their cavalry to form a screen between Eumenes and the rest of his army. The battle of the elephants and skirmishers was decided when Eumenes' lead elephant was killed and the rest became so unnerved they fled. Antigonus had clearly won the battle on the right flank.

Meanwhile, in the center the two phalanxes had engaged. Spearheaded by the nigh invincible Silver Shields, Eumenes's phalanx had won a clear victory. Eumenes now ordered Peucestas to go back into combat with his cavalry and exploit the advantage, but the latter refused, retreating even further instead. Antigonus ordered Pheiton (in command of the right flank) to attack Eumenes's phalanx in the rear. This forced Eumenes's heavy infantry to break off their victorious pursuit, but being battle-hardened veterans, they kept their head, formed a square and marched safely off the battlefield.

== Aftermath ==
The battle's result was, like Paraitakene, inconclusive, with Eumenes still possessing a strong force. That evening, Eumenes attempted to convince the army to fight Antigonus again the next day. His army was reluctant, as they had just found out their camp had been plundered, the satraps wanted to retire to protect their satrapies. It was the Silver Shields who took matters into their own hands. Learning that Antigonus had their wives, children, servants and booty, they secretly opened negotiations with Antigonus. A deal was struck whereby Antigonus would return their baggage and families in return for Eumenes and a promise of future allegiance. The Silver Shields promptly arrested Eumenes and his senior officers and handed them over to Antigonus.

Eumenes was put under heavy guard while Antigonus held a council to decide his fate. Demetrius and Nearchos urged Antigonus to spare Eumenes's life, but most of the council members insisted he execute Eumenes. So it was decided, then, and Eumenes met his end, his body being turned over to his friends for burial. Eudemus, who had come from India as an ally of Eumenes and was responsible for the recruitment of Eumenes' elephants and light infantry was also executed, as was the leader of the Argyraspides, Antigenes.

The Macedonians of Eumenes's army were drawn into the ranks of Antigonus's army. Given the fickle loyalty of the Silver Shields (betraying Eumenes and Antigenes), Antigonus decided to send the 1,000 unruliest of them to the far off satrapy of Arachosia to fight in the frontier war with the Indians, the local satrap Sibyrtius was given special orders to regard them as expendable.

== Popular culture ==
Alfred Duggan's novel on the life of Demetrius, Elephants and Castles, also covers the battle.

The third novel in Christian Cameron's Tyrant series, Funeral Games features the Battle of Gabiene.

== Modern sources ==
- John Hackett, Warfare in the Classical World. London: Sidgwick & Jackson. 1989. ISBN 0-283-99591-2.
- Richard A. Billows, Antigonos the One-Eyed and the Creation of the Hellenistic State, 1990. ISBN 0-520-20880-3.
- Lecture Notes for Week Fourteen
