= Second War of the Diadochi =

319–315 BC war after Alexander the Great's death

Date	319–315 BC
Location	Alexander's former empire
Result	Cassanderian victory; Cassander succeeds as Regent of Macedon
Territorial changes	Antigonus takes over Eumenes' Asian territories, giving him a central location in Alexander's former empire, which leaves him vulnerable for the Third War of the Diadochi.; Cassander takes over Macedon as Regent; Polyperchon flees to the Peloponnesus, still in charge of Corinth and Sicyon.

Belligerents
Polyperchon's faction	Cassander's faction

Commanders and leaders
Polyperchon; Eumenes (executed); Olympias (executed); Aeacides of Epirus	Cassander; Antigonus; Ptolemy; Lysimachus; Eurydice (executed); Philip Arrhidaeus (executed)

The Second War of the Diadochi was the conflict between the coalition of Polyperchon (as Regent of the Empire), Olympias and Eumenes and the coalition of Cassander, Antigonus, Ptolemy and Lysimachus following the death of Cassander's father, Antipater (the old Regent).

== Background ==
The unexpected death of Alexander the Great left his vast, and newly created, empire without a clear successor. This lack of a clear arrangement for succession eventually led to war between his top generals, the Diadochi. In a series of shifting alliances they proceeded to carve out kingdoms and independent empires from Alexander's conquests.

Following the first conflict, Antipater became the de facto ruler of Alexander's European territories, while Antigonus gained a similar position in Asia, a position Antigonus had to attain through hard campaigning and numerous battles (see: the battles of Orkynia and Cretopolis). In 319 BC, when Antipater died, he left his domain in the hands of his lieutenant, Polyperchon, as opposed to his son Cassander. Cassander, however, had the support of Antigonus, and Ptolemy (the current ruler of Egypt) while Polyperchon was supported by Eumenes (Philip and Alexander's former secretary) who commanded a small army in Cappadocia.

== The war ==
At the start of 318 BC Arrhidaios, the governor of Hellespontine Phrygia, tried to take the city of Cyzicus. Antigonus, as the Strategos of Asia, took this as a challenge to his authority and recalled his army from winter quarters. He sent an army against Arrhidaios while he himself marched with the main army into Lydia against its governor Cleitus, whom he drove out of his province.

Cleitus fled to Macedon and joined Polyperchon, the new Regent of the Empire, who decided to march his army south to force the Greek cities to side with him against Cassander and Antigonus. Cassander, reinforced with troops and a fleet by Antigonus, sailed to Athens and thwarted Polyperchon's efforts to take the city. From Athens, Polyperchon marched on Megalopolis which had sided with Cassander and besieged the city. The siege failed and he had to retreat, losing much prestige and most of the Greek cities. Eventually Polyperchon retreated all the way to Epirus with the infant King Alexander IV. There he joined forces with Alexander's mother Olympias and re-invaded Macedon. King Philip Arrhidaeus, Alexander's half-brother, having defected to Cassander's side at the prompting of his wife, Eurydice, was forced to flee, only to be captured in Amphipolis, resulting in the execution of himself and the forced suicide of his wife, both purportedly at the instigation of Olympias. Cassander rallied once more, and seized Macedon. Olympias was murdered, and Cassander gained control of the infant King and his mother. Eventually Cassander became the dominant power in the European part of the Empire, ruling over Macedon and large parts of Greece.

Meanwhile, Eumenes, who had gathered a small army in Cappadocia, had entered the coalition of Polyperchon and Olympias. He took his army to the royal treasury at Kyinda in Cilicia and used its funds to recruit mercenaries. He also secured the loyalty of 6,000 of Alexander's veterans, the Agyraspidis (the Silver Shields) and the Hypaspists, who were stationed in Cilicia. In the spring of 317 BC, he marched his army to Phoenica and raised a naval force on the behalf of Polyperchon. Antigonus had spent the rest of 318 consolidating his position and gathering a fleet. He now used this fleet (under the command of Nicanor who had returned from Athens) against Polyperchon's fleet in the Hellespont. In a two-day battle near Byzantium, Nicanor and Antigonus destroyed Polyperchon's fleet. Then, after settling his affairs in western Asia Minor, Antigonus marched against Eumenes at the head of a great army. Eumenes hurried out of Phoenicia and marched his army east to gather support in the eastern provinces. In this he was successful; most of the eastern satraps joined his cause (when he arrived in Susiana) more than doubling his army. They marched and counter-marched throughout Mesopotamia, Babylonia, Susiana and Media until they faced each other on a plain in the country of the Paraitakene in southern Media. There they fought a great battle (the battle of Paraitakene), which ended inconclusively. The next year (315) they fought another great but inconclusive battle (the battle of Gabiene), during which some of Antigonus's troops plundered the enemy camp. Using this plunder as a bargaining tool, Antigonus bribed the Agyraspides, who arrested and handed over Eumenes. Antigonus had Eumenes and a couple of his officers executed. With Eumenes's death, the war in the eastern part of the Empire ended.

Antigonus and Cassander had won the war. Antigonus now controlled Asia Minor and the eastern provinces, Cassander, Macedon and large parts of Greece, Lysimachus Thrace, and Ptolemy, Egypt, Syria, Cyrene and Cyprus. Their enemies were either dead or seriously reduced in power and influence.

== Aftermath ==
The war had shifted the balance of power to such a degree that Antigonus could pose a threat to any or all of the other Diadochi; this led to Cassander, Ptolemy (with Seleucus) and Lysimachus allying against him in the Third War of the Diadochi. The territories now controlled by Antigonus would later form the basis of the Seleucid Empire.
