= Hieronymus of Cardia =

4th/3rd century BC Greek general and historian

Hieronymus of Cardia (Greek: Ἱερώνυμος ὁ Καρδιανός) was a Greek officer, administrator, and historian from Cardia in Thrace, active from the late fourth to the mid-third century BC. He is one of the most important contemporary historians of the Diadochi, and the principal lost source for much of the period between the death of Alexander the Great and the early third century BC.

== Early life ==
The precise date of Hieronymus’ birth is unknown, but Heckel favors a date in the late 350s. Hieronymus was a native of Cardia in Thrace, a city that produced several prominent figures in the age of Alexander, most notably Eumenes of Cardia. Hieronymus was likely the nephew of Eumenes, whose father was also named Hieronymus. Hieronymus likely accompanied his uncle Eumenes eastward during Alexander's campaigns in Asia.

He first appears securely in the historical record in 320/319 BC, when Eumenes, then besieged by Antigonus Monophthalmus at Nora, dispatched him as an envoy to Antipater in Macedonia. Hieronymus thereafter remained closely attached to Eumenes throughout the latter’s campaigns against Antigonus, accompanying him during his movements in Asia Minor and the eastern satrapies. He was present at the defeat of Eumenes at the Battle of Gabiene in 316 BC, where he was wounded and taken prisoner.

== Antigonid Service ==
After the defeat and execution of Eumenes, Hieronymus was treated kindly by Antigonus, who took him into his service.

In 312 BC, Antigonus entrusted Hieronymus with overseeing the collection of bitumen from the Dead Sea. Diodorus describes Hieronymus in this context as epimeletes of the operation; however, Josephus states that Hieronymus had been placed in charge of Syria by Antigonus. Billows has argued that Hieronymus should likely be regarded at this time as governor of Coele-Syria (modern Palestine), within whose jurisdiction the Dead Sea lay, and for whom the supervision of bitumen extraction would naturally have formed part of a wider administrative command.

Hieronymus was campaigning with Antigonus in 301 BC and was present at the Battle of Ipsus, where Antigonus was killed.

Following the defeat at Ipsus, Hieronymus appears to have withdrawn with Demetrius Poliorcetes to Greece. In 293 BC, Demetrius appointed him governor of Thebes, entrusting him with the combined offices of epimeletēs and harmostēs. Hieronymus did not accompany Demetrius on his final Asian campaign in 286 BC, instead remaining in Greece and subsequently attaching himself more closely to Antigonus Gonatas, under whom he spent the remainder of his life.

== Later Life and Works ==
Hieronymus wrote a history of the Diadochi and their successors, covering the period from the death of Alexander in 323 BC down to at least the early 270s BC. His work was among the most important contemporary narratives of the early Hellenistic world and served as a principal source for later historians, especially Diodorus Siculus (Books XVIII-XX) and Plutarch, notably in the Life of Pyrrhus.

He used official documents and firsthand experience gathered during his prolonged service in senior military and administrative roles. His narrative style was regarded as plain and unadorned, which may have contributed to its limited popularity in antiquity, but modern scholarship consistently regards his work as exceptionally careful, detailed, and reliable. In the later portions of his history, Hieronymus acquainted Greek readers with the character and early history of Rome, an unusual interest for a Greek historian of his generation. Ancient authors accused Hieronymus of partiality toward Antigonus Gonatas, while treating other Successors with hostility. Hieronymus appears to have spent the final phase of his life under the patronage of Antigonus Gonatas, probably at the Antigonid court, where he is generally thought to have composed at least the later portions of his historical work.

Later tradition, preserved by Agatharchides and transmitted through Lucian, credits Hieronymus with an exceptional lifespan of 104 years. Since Hieronymus recorded events as late as the death of Pyrrhus of Epirus in 272 BC and the death of Mithridates I of Pontus in 266 BC, he must have lived well into the mid-third century BC.

No substantial portion of Hieronymus’ history survives intact. Nevertheless, his work was extensively excerpted and paraphrased by later authors. His surviving fragments were collected by Karl Wilhelm Ludwig Müller in Fragmenta Historicorum Graecorum (II pp. 450-61), and by Felix Jacoby in Die Fragmente der griechischen Historiker (= FGrHist 154).

== Bibliography ==
- J. Hornblower, Hieronymus of Cardia (Oxford: Oxford University Press, 1981).
- Joseph Roisman, "Hieronymus of Cardia: Causation and Bias from Alexander to his Successors," in Elizabeth Carney and Daniel Ogden (eds), Philip II and Alexander the Great: Father and Son, Lives and Afterlives (Oxford University Press, 2010: ISBN 0-19-973815-7).
- Richard A. Billows, Antigonos the One-Eyed and the Creation of the Hellenistic State (Berkeley: University of California Press, 1997).
- Waldemar Heckel, Who’s Who in the Age of Alexander the Great: Prosopography of Alexander’s Empire (Malden, MA: Blackwell Publishing, 2006).
