= Eudemus (general) =

Macedonian general (died 316 BC)

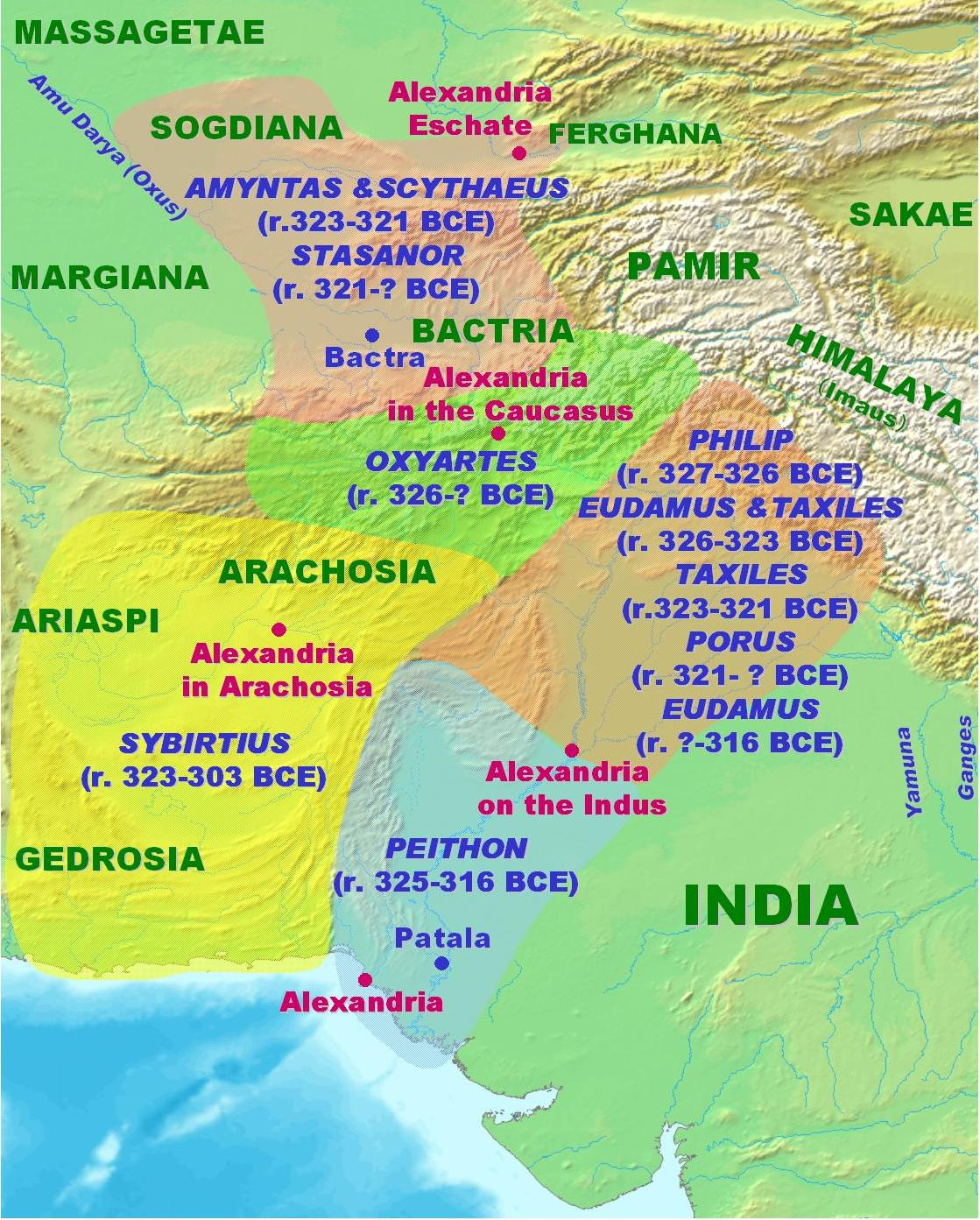
Eudemus ruled, first with Taxiles, the northern dominions of the Indus, down to the junction of the Indus and the Acesines.

Eudemus (Ancient Greek: Εὔδημος; died 316 BC) was one of Alexander the Great's generals. In 326 BC, he was appointed by Alexander as one of the commanders of the troops in India along with Peithon, Porus and Taxiles. After Alexander's death, Eudemus assassinated Porus and effectively controlled Alexander's northern Indian territories until he became involved in the Wars of the Diadochi during which he was captured and killed by Antigonus.

== Biography ==
In 326 BC, Eudemus was appointed by Alexander the Great to the command of the troops left in India, after the murder of the Alexander-appointed satrap Philip (son of Machatas) by his own mercenary troops in 326 BC. Alexander dispatched letters to India to Eudemus and also to Taxilas telling them to take charge of the district formerly under Philip, until Alexander could send a satrap to govern the district.

According to Diodorus Siculus after Alexander's unexpected death in 323 BC, Eudemus assassinated the Indian king Porus. As a result, Eudemus became very powerful and in 317 BC, he was able to support Eumenes of Cardia in his war against Antigonus by providing a force of 500 cavalry, 300 infantry, and 120 war elephants.

Eudemus and his troops saw active service in the first Battle of Gabiene, although his troops suffered considerably from an attack by Antigonus:

"On his left wing Eumenes stationed Eudemus, who had brought the elephants from India" Diodorus Siculus, XIX-27
"Antigonus, now that a break was thus caused in the line of the enemy, charged through with a detachment of cavalry, striking on the flank the troops who had been stationed with Eudemus on the left wing. Because the attack was unexpected, he quickly put to flight those who faced him, destroying many of them". Diodorus Siculus XIX-30

Ceteus, the general of Eudemus' Indian troops, died in the action.

It seems nevertheless that Eudemus was jealous of Eumenes and joined in the conspiracy of Antigenes and Teutamus against him. As a result, Eumenes was betrayed to Antigonus by these officers under his command. Eumenes lost control of his army's baggage camp which included all the loot of the most decorated Macedonian veterans (called the Argyraspides, or Silver Shields). This treasure had been accumulated over 30 years of successful warfare. Antigonus responded to a request for the return of the baggage train sent by Teutamus, one of their commanders, by demanding they give him Eumenes. The Silver Shields agreed to this.

Following the surrender of Eumenes, Eudemus was put to death by order of Antigonus, to whom Eudemus had always shown a marked hostility:

"Now that Antigonus had unexpectedly mastered Eumenes and all the army that had been opposing him, he seized Antigenes, the commander of the Silver Shields, put him into a pit, and burned him alive. He slew Eudemus, who had brought the elephants from India." Diodorus Siculus, XIX-44
