= Alexippus =

4th-century BC Greek physician

Alexippus (Ancient Greek: Ἀλέξιππος) was an ancient Greek physician who was mentioned by Plutarch as having received a letter from Alexander the Great himself, to thank him for having cured one of his officers, a man named Peucestas, of a wound incurred during a bear hunt probably around 327 BC.
