= Peucestas =

4th century BC Macedonian commander

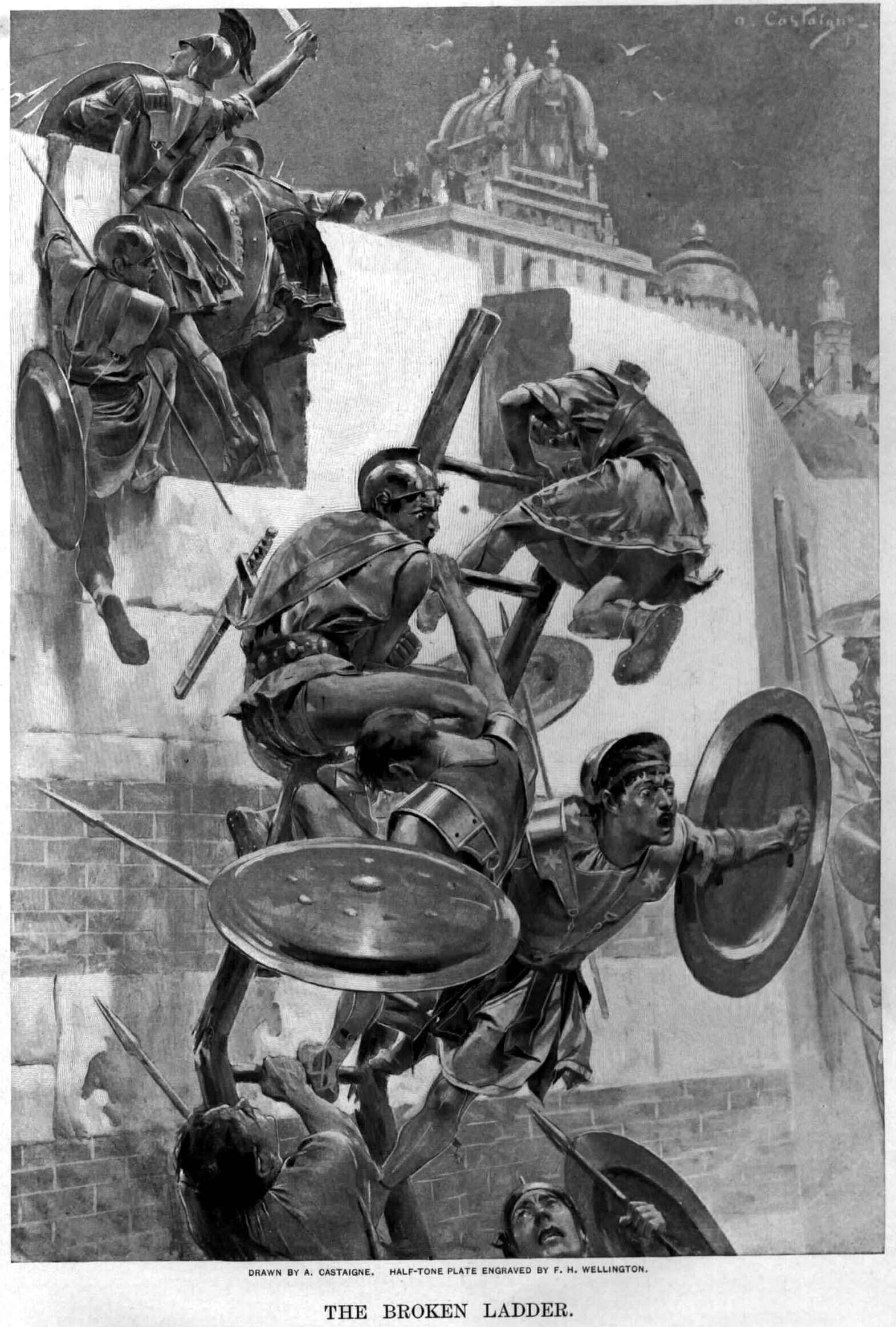
- The ladder breaks stranding Alexander and a few companions, including Peucestas, within the Mallian town during the Mallian Campaign. André Castaigne (1898-1899).

Satrap of Persis
- Reign: 324–316 BC
- Predecessor: Ariobarzanes of Persis
- Successor: Asclepiodorus

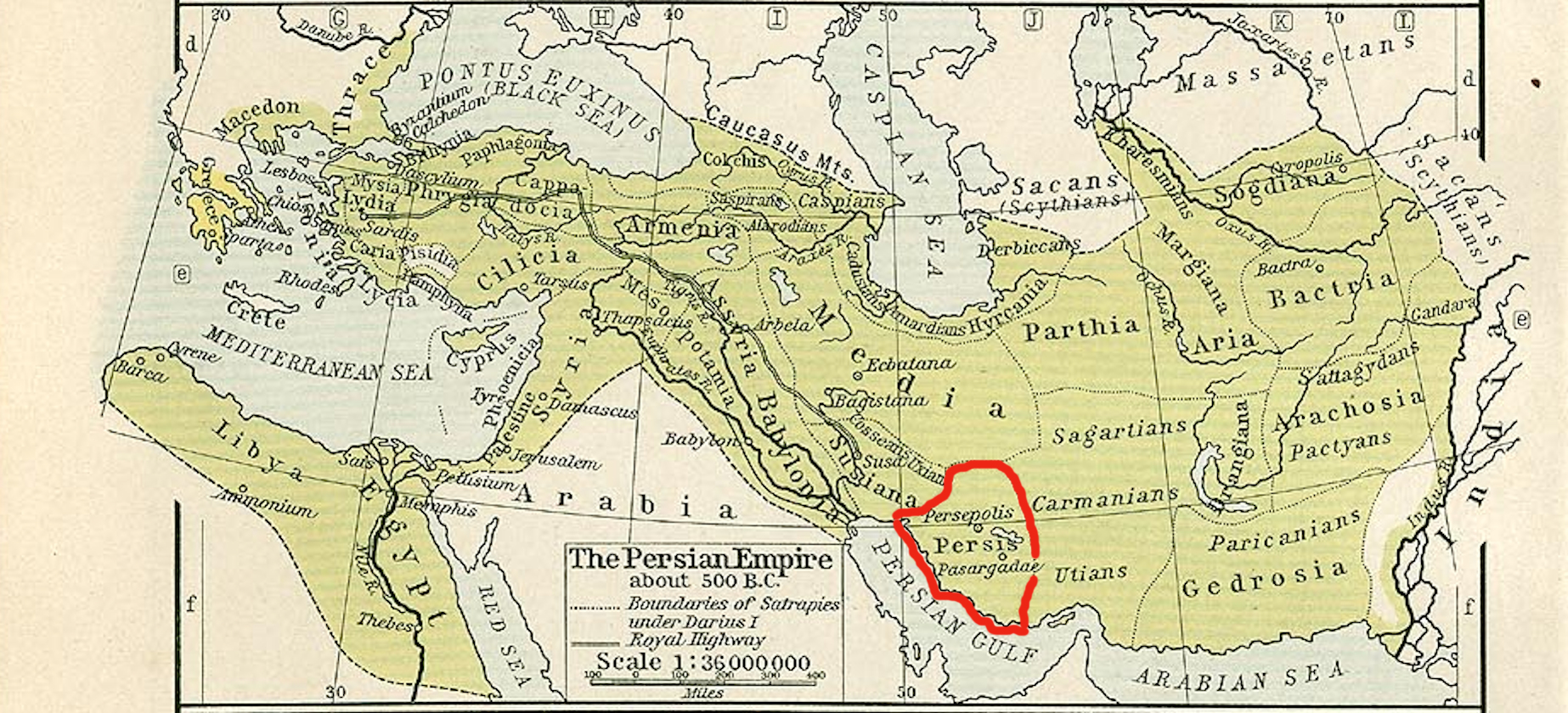
Peucestas was named satrap of Persis upon Alexander's return from India in 324 BC.

Peucestas (Ancient Greek: Πευκέστας, Peukéstas; lived 4th century BC), son of Markatatos, was a native of the town of Mieza, in Macedonia, and a distinguished officer in the service of Alexander the Great. His name is first mentioned as one of those appointed to command a trireme on the Hydaspes. Prior to this he must have distinguished himself for his personal valour and prowess, as he was the person selected by Alexander to carry before him in battle the sacred shield, which he had taken down from the temple of Athena at Troy. In this capacity he was in close attendance upon the king's person in the assault on the capital city of the Malavas (325 BC); and all authors agreed in attributing the chief share in saving the life of Alexander upon that occasion to Peucestas, while they differed as to almost all the other circumstances and persons concerned.

For his services on this occasion he was rewarded by the king with almost every distinction which it was in his power to confer. On the arrival of Alexander at Persepolis, he bestowed upon Peucestas the important satrapy of Persis, but, previous to this, he had already raised him to the rank of somatophylax (the king's bodyguard), an honour rendered the more conspicuous in this instance by the number of those select officers being augmented on purpose to make room for his admission. At Susa, also, Peucestas was the first of those rewarded with crowns of gold for their past exploits. After this he proceeded to take possession of his government, where he conciliated the favour of the Persians subject to his rule, as well as that of Alexander himself, by adopting the Persian dress and customs, in exchange for those of Macedonia; whence he is considered a Persophile.

In the spring of 323 BC, Peucestas joined the king at Babylon, with an army of 20,000 Persian troops; and is mentioned as one of those in attendance upon him during his last illness. It does not appear that he took any leading part in the discussions that ensued upon the death of Alexander, but in the division of the provinces that followed, he obtained the renewal of his government of Persis, which he also retained in the second partition at Triparadisus, 321 BC. All his attention seems to have been directed to strengthening himself in this position and extending his power and influence as far as possible. In this he so far succeeded, that when he was at length compelled to take an active part in the war between Antigonus and Eumenes (317 BC), he obtained by common consent the chief command of all the forces furnished by the satrapies east of the Tigris river; and was with difficulty induced to waive his pretensions to the supreme direction of the war. Eumenes, however, by his dexterous management, soothed the irritation of Peucestas, and retained him firmly in his alliance throughout the two campaigns that followed. The satrap was contented to gratify his pride by feasting the whole of the armies assembled in Persis on a scale of royal magnificence, while Eumenes virtually directed all the operations of the war.

But the disaster in the final action at the Battle of Gabiene near Gadamarta (316 BC) which led to the capture of the baggage, and the surrender of Eumenes by the Argyraspids, appears to have been due to the misconduct and insubordination of Peucestas, who, according to one account, was himself one of the chief advisers of the treaty. His conduct throughout these campaigns shows that he lacked both the ability to command for himself, and the moderation to follow the superior judgment of others. His vain and ambitious character seems to have been appreciated at its just value by Antigonus, who, while he deprived him of his satrapy, and led him away a virtual prisoner, elated him with false hopes and specious promises, which were never fulfilled. Peucestas seems to have become an Antigonid officer, treating with cities like Theangela on their behalf. He maintained his prominence during Demetrius's reign as the king of Macedon.

A statue of Peucestes was created by Tisicrates of Sicyon.

== See also ==
- Alexippus
