= Paraetacene =

Paraetacene (Παραιτακηνή) was a district of ancient Persis which extended along the whole of its northern frontier in the direction of Media Magna, to which, indeed, it in part belonged. The name is first mentioned by Herodotus, who calls one of the tribes of the Medians Paraetaceni. The same district comprehended what are now called the Bakhtyari mountains and tribes. The whole country was rugged and mountainous and appears to have been inhabited, like the adjacent province of Cossaea, by wild and robber tribes. The inhabitants were called Paraetaceni or Paraetacae.

It was the location of the Battle of Paraitakene in 317 BCE.

There has been considerable discussion with regard to the origin of this name. The best determination seems to be that it is derived from a Persian word, Paruta, signifying mountain. [confer Sanskrit Parvata]. It will be observed that while Herodotus gives the Paraetceni a Median origin, and Stephanus of Byzantium calls Paraetaca a Median town, Strabo gives one portion of the district so named to the Assyrian province of Apolloniatis or Sittacene. There were, however, other places of the same name at considerable distances from the Median or Persian province. Thus, one is mentioned between Bactriana and Sogdiana, between the Oxus and Jaxartes, and another between Drangiana and Arachosia. In India, too, we find the Paryeti Montes, one of the outlying spurs of the still greater chain of the Paropamisus (or Hindu Kush).
