= Macedonian phalanx =

Ancient infantry formation

The Macedonian phalanx (Greek: Μακεδονική φάλαγξ) was an infantry formation developed by Philip II from the classical Greek hoplite phalanx, of which the main innovation was the use of the sarissa, a 6-metre pike. It was famously commanded by him during the rise of Macedon between 359 and 336 BC, and by his son Alexander the Great during his conquest of the Achaemenid Empire and campaigns between 336 and 323 BC.

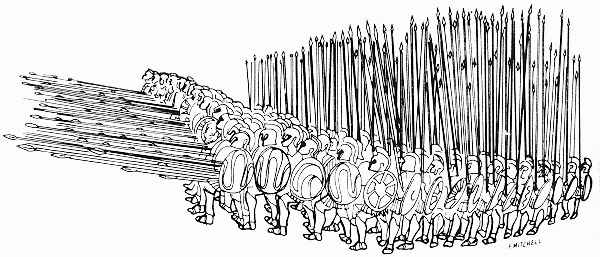
Drawing of a full 256-man phalanx formation

The Macedonian phalanx model then spread throughout the Hellenistic world, where it became the standard battle formation for pitched battles. During the Second Macedonian War (200–197 BC), Roman-Seleucid War (191–188 BC) and Third Macedonian War (171–168 BC) against the Roman Republic, the Hellenistic phalanx, both the Antigonid phalanx and the Seleucid phalanx, appeared less adaptable to changing conditions on the battlefield against the more flexible Roman legions.

== Development ==
General Macedonian battle formation

In 359 BC, following the Macedonian defeat by the Illyrians, which killed the majority of Macedonia's army and King Perdiccas III of Macedon, Perdiccas' brother Philip II took the throne. Philip II was a hostage in Thebes for much of his youth (367–360), where he witnessed the combat tactics of the general Epaminondas, which then influenced his restructuring of the infantry. Philip's military reforms were a new approach to the current hoplite warfare which focused on their shield, the aspis; his focus was on a new weapon, the sarissa. The first phalanx was a 10-by-10 square with very few experienced troops. The phalanx was later changed to a 16-by-16 formation, and while the date for this change is still unknown, it occurred before 331 under Philip's rule. Philip called the soldiers in the phalanx pezhetairoi, meaning 'foot-companions', bolstering the importance of the phalanx to the King. Philip also increased the amount of training required for the infantry and introduced regulations on military behaviour. During Alexander's campaign, the phalanx remained more or less the same, with the notable difference being more non-Macedonian soldiers among the ranks.

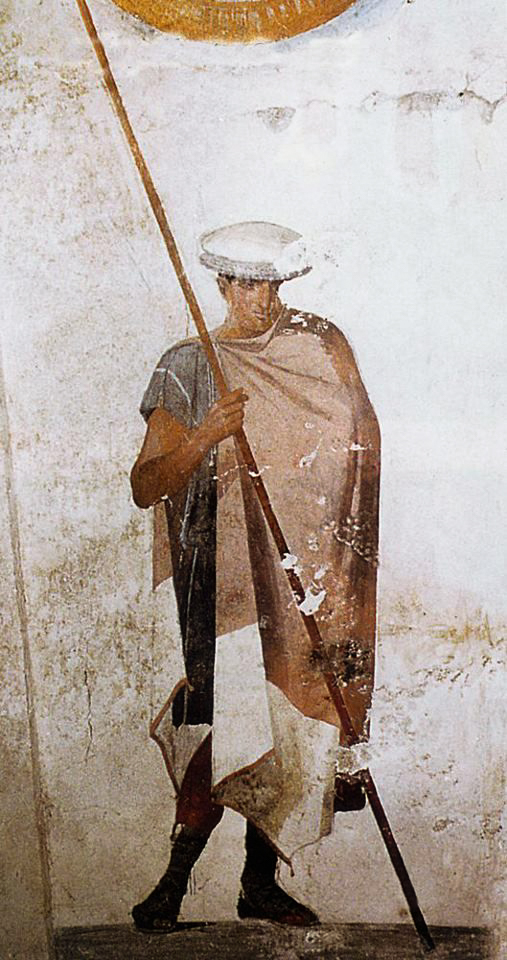
Fresco of a Macedonian soldier wielding a spear and wearing a kausia, from the tomb of Agios Athanasios, Thessaloniki, Greece

== Equipment ==
Each phalangite carried as his primary weapon a sarissa, a double-pointed pike over 6 m (18 ft) in length. The weight of the sarissa is unknown, as no surviving examples have been found, but modern reconstructions have shown that a 5.8 m pike could weigh no more than 4.05 kg (9 lb). At close range such large weapons were of little use, but an intact phalanx could easily keep its enemies at a distance. The weapons of the first five rows of men all projected beyond the front of the formation, so that there were more spear points than available targets at any given time. Men in rows behind the initial five angled their spears at a 45-degree angle in an attempt to ward off arrows or other projectiles. The secondary weapon was a shortsword called a xiphos. The phalangites also had a smaller and flatter shield than that of the Greek aspis, measuring about 24 inches and weighing about 12 pounds. The shield, called a "telamon", was made of bronze plated wood and was worn hung around the neck so as to free up both hands to wield the sarissa. All of the armor and weaponry a phalangite would carry totaled about 40 pounds, which was close to 10 pounds less than the weight of Greek hoplites' equipment.

== Formation ==
The phalanx consisted of a line-up of several battalion blocks called syntagmata, each of its 16 files (lochoi) numbering 16 men, for a total of 256 in each unit. Each syntagma was commanded by a syntagmatarch, who—together with his subordinate officers—would form the first row of each block.

Each file was led and commanded by a dekadarch who were the most experienced Macedonian soldiers and received about triple pay. The leader was followed by another two experienced Macedonian soldiers, with a third positioned at the very end of the file, all three who received about double pay. The rest of the file was filled up by more inexperienced soldiers, often Persians during Alexander's campaign. The phalanx was divided into taxis based on geographical recruitment differences.

The phalanx used the "oblique line with reduced left" arrangement, designed to force enemies to engage with soldiers on the furthest right end, increasing the risk of opening a gap in their lines for the cavalry to break through. Due to the structure of the phalanx, it was weakest in the rear and on the right.

Neither Philip nor Alexander actually used the phalanx as their arm of choice, but instead used it to hold the enemy in place (as anvil) while their heavy cavalry broke through their ranks (as hammer). The Macedonian cavalry fought in wedge formation and was almost always stationed on the far right. The hypaspists, elite infantrymen who served as the king's bodyguard, were always stationed on the immediate right of the phalanx wielding hoplite sized spears and shields in order to protect its flanks. The left flank was generally covered by allied cavalry supplied by the Thessalians, which fought in rhomboid formation and served mainly in a defensive role. Other forces—skirmishers, range troops, reserves of allied hoplites, archers, and artillery—were also employed.

== Key battles ==
- Battle of Erigon Valley (358 BC)
- Battle of Crocus Field (353/352 BC)
- Battle of Chaeronea (338 BC)
- Battle of the Granicus (334 BC)
- Battle of Issus (333 BC)
- Battle of Gaugamela (331 BC)
- Battle of Megalopolis (331 BC)
- Battle of the Hydaspes (326 BC)
- Battle of the Hellespont (321 BC)
- Battle of Paraitakene (317 BC)
- Battle of Gabiene (315 BC)
- Battle of Gaza (312 BC)
- Battle of Ipsus (301 BC)
- Battle of Corupedium (281 BC)
- Battle of Heraclea (280 BC)
- Battle of Asculum (279 BC)
- Battle of Beneventum (275 BC)
- Battle of the Aous (274 BC)
- Battle of Sellasia (222 BC)
- Battle of Raphia (217 BC)
- Battle of Panium (200 BC)
- Battle of Cynoscephalae (197 BC)
- Battle of Thermopylae (191 BC)
- Battle of Magnesia (189 BC)
- Battle of Pydna (168 BC)

== See also ==
- Hellenistic armies
