= Teutamus =

Ancient Macedonian officer

Teutamus is also a spider genus (Liocranidae)

Teutamus (Ancient Greek: Tεύταμoς; lived 4th century BC) was a Macedonian officer, who, in 319 BC, shared with Antigenes the command of the select troops called the Argyraspids.

== Etymology ==
The name Teutamos appears to contain the Proto-Indo-European root *teutéh_{a}-, a word meaning "people" or "tribe". The root also appears in Celtic names, such as Celtic deity Toutatis, and in the name of ancient Illyrian ruler Teuta.

Joseph Vendryes had suggested that compound names with the stem *teutéh_{a}- seem to be common around the southeast Europe and the Balkans, although the name "is attested ... in Messapic, in Osco-Umbrian, in Venetic, in Gaulish, in Celtiberian, in Brittonic languages, in Welsh, in German and in the Baltic languages".

== History ==
The details of his military career and promotion are unknown until the present moment.

When Eumenes, after escaping from Nora, joined the Argyraspids in Cilicia, Antigenes and Teutamus at first, in obedience to the orders of the regent Polyperchon and Olympias, placed themselves under his command but they secretly regarded him with jealousy, and Teutamus even listened to the overtures of Ptolemy, and would have joined in a plot against the life of Eumenes, had he not been dissuaded by his more prudent colleague. But though they continued to follow the guidance of Eumenes, and with the troops under their command, bore an important part in his campaigns against Antigonus, they took every opportunity of displaying their envy and jealousy, which their general in vain tried to allay, by avoiding all appearance of the exercise of authority. During the winter campaign in Gabiene (316 BC) the two leaders of the Argyraspids were the prime movers of a plot for the destruction of Eumenes; and after the final action, Teutamus was the first to open negotiations with Antigonus for the recovery of the baggage of the Argyraspids by the betrayal of his rival into his hands. By this act of treachery he probably hoped to secure the favour of Antigonus, as well as to supplant his own colleague or leader, Antigenes; but we find no farther mention of his name, and it is probable that he was sent, with the greater part of the Argyraspids, to perish in Arachosia.
