= Upper Satrapies =

The Upper Satrapies (Greek: ἄνω σατραπεῖαι, romanized: anō satrapeiai) is a collective term used in the Hellenistic period to refer to the eastern, Iranian-populated, provinces ("satrapies") of the empire of Alexander the Great, especially during the Wars of the Diadochi and the subsequent Seleucid Empire. At times, it also corresponded to a single super-province, under a strategos "in charge of the upper satrapies" (Greek: ὁ ἐπί τῶν ἄνω σατραπειῶν, romanized: ho epi tōn anō satrapeiōn).

== Extent ==
The Upper Satrapies comprised the entire eastern half of the territories conquered by Alexander: typically everything east of the River Tigris, from the Zagros Mountains in the west to the borders of India in the southeast and Central Asia in the northeast, including the provinces of Media, Persis, Carmania, Drangiane, Hyrcania, Parthia, Margiane, Aria, Baktria, and Sogdiane. The area initially also included the easternmost conquests of Alexander in India and modern-day Afghanistan and Pakistan (the Paropamisadai, Arachosia, and Gedrosia), but these were definitively lost to Chandragupta Maurya in 303 BC, after his treaty with Seleucus I Nicator.

== History ==
=== Possible Achaemenid antecedents ===
It is possible that the concept and province of the "Upper Satrapies" was created already during the late Achaemenid Empire, where superior military commands covering several satrapies are attested for Asia Minor at least, with scholars hypothesizing also the existence of similar arrangements for the Armenian, Syriac-Babylonian and eastern satrapies. The evidence for the eastern satrapies is based on a statement by Diodorus of Sicily that Artaxerxes III entrusted the Upper Satrapies to Bagoas, but this may be an anachronism, and no other piece of evidence survives indicating any continuity between the Achaemenid and Hellenistic periods in this regard.

=== Establishment under the Diadochi ===
The first mention of the "Upper Satrapies" comes from 316 BC, when Peithon was named strategos of Media and of the Upper Satrapies as well by Antigonos I Monophthalmos. Peithon, the satrap of Media, had been elected by the army assembly in 323 BC to supervise the suppression of a revolt by mercenaries in the eastern satrapies, and had received some plenipotentiary powers over the local satraps. Although likely not envisioned at the outset as an overarching military command as it later became, Peithon appears to have attempted to gradually impose just such an authority over the local satraps, which led to the latter banding together against him and evicting him in 317 BC. It was in this context that Antigonos recognized his claims to win him over, although soon after, Antigonos had Peithon arrested and executed.

After Peithon's execution, Antigonos appointed two officers to replace him: Orontobates as satrap of Media, and Hippostratos as strategos. According to Hermann Bengtson, Hippostratos occupied an intermediate position between a full strategos of the Upper Satrapies, and a provincial satrap; Hippostratos thus likely commanded the troops of the royal army (the βασιλική δύναμις) stationed in the eastern provinces, while the satraps commanded only their local levies. Hippostratos' appointment was a temporary expediency, and in 315, Antigonos named his general Nikanor as strategos over Media and the Upper Satrapies. The fact that the institution of the post coincided with Antigonos' departure from Babylonia for the Mediterranean to fight against his rivals, and the absence of similar arrangements in the western provinces of his realm, where he was present in person, show that the post was meant to provide for the security of the eastern provinces while Antigonos himself was absent and preoccupied in the west. Nikanor remained in control of the Antigonos' eastern provinces until the invasion of Babylonia by Seleukos I in 312, when he marched to confront him but fell in battle. As a result, the eastern satrapies came under Seleukos' control, and the special command over the Upper Satrapies was abolished for the time being.

== Sources ==
- Aperghis, G. G. (2004). The Seleukid Royal Economy: The Finances and Financial Administration of the Seleukid Empire. Cambridge University Press. ISBN 9781139456135.
- Bengtson, Hermann (1964a). Die Strategie in der hellenistischen Zeit. Ein Beitrag zum antiken Staatsrecht (in German). Vol. I. Munich: C.H.Beck'sche Verlagsbuchhandlung. pp. 176–186, 197, 207, 208.
- Bengtson, Hermann (1964b). Die Strategie in der hellenistischen Zeit. Ein Beitrag zum antiken Staatsrecht (in German). Vol. II. Munich: C.H.Beck'sche Verlagsbuchhandlung. pp. 78–89.
- Bengtson, Hermann (1967). Die Strategie in der hellenistischen Zeit. Ein Beitrag zum antiken Staatsrecht (in German). Vol. III. Munich: C.H.Beck'sche Verlagsbuchhandlung. pp. 192, 200.
- Briant, Pierre (2002). From Cyrus to Alexander: A History of the Persian Empire. Eisenbrauns. ISBN 9781575061207.
