= Nora (Cappadocia) =

Town of ancient Cappadocia

Coordinates: 38°16′19″N 34°22′29″E

- Νῶρα (Ancient Greek)
- Location within Turkey Location within Near East
- Location: Güzelyurt, Aksaray Province, Turkey
- Region: Central Anatolia

Nora (Ancient Greek: τὰ Νῶρα) was a mountain fortress and town of ancient Cappadocia, on the frontiers of Lycaonia. Located at the foot of Mount Taurus, in which Eumenes was for a whole winter besieged by Antigonus (319 BC), before he escaped. In Strabo's time it was called Neroassus or Neroassos (Νηροασσός), and served as a treasury to Sicinus, who was striving to obtain the sovereignty of Cappadocia.

Its site is tentatively located near Gelin tepe in (Aksaray Province), a small mound lying c. 3.5 km (2.2 mi) east to the modern town of Güzelyurt and behind the village of Sivrihisar Asiatic Turkey.
