= Argyraspides =

Ancient Macedonian military unit

The Argyraspides (Ancient Greek: Ἀργυράσπιδες, lit. 'Silver Shields') were elite Macedonian soldiers who carried silver-plated shields, hence their name. The original unit were hypaspists serving in the army of Alexander the Great. During the Wars of the Diadochi, they initially served Eumenes, but betrayed him to Antigonus I Monophthalmus at the Battle of Gabiene in 316. After their dispersal under Antigonus, later units of the Seleucid Empire and Roman Empire would be modeled after them.

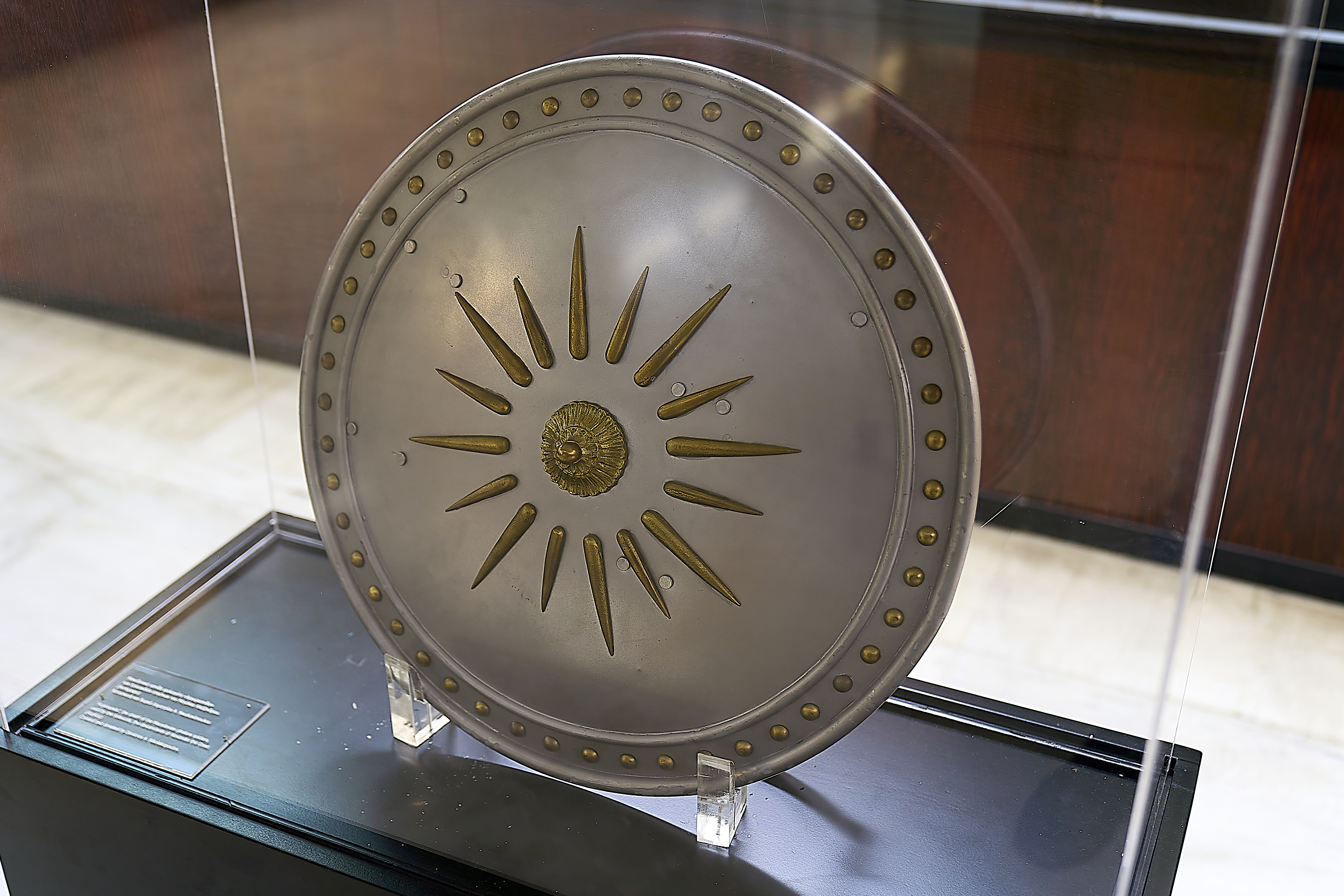
Replica of the Argyraspides shield at the Athens War Museum

== Alexander the Great ==
They were a division of the Macedonian army of Alexander the Great. They were picked men commanded by Nicanor, the son of Parmenion, as well as Seleucus, and were held in high honor by Alexander. They were hypaspists, having changed their name to the Argyraspides whilst in India under Alexander.

== Wars of the Diadochi ==
After the death of Alexander in 323 BC, they followed Eumenes. They were veterans, and although most of them were over sixty, they were feared and revered due to their battle skills and experience. They were so influential that both Ptolemy I Soter and Antigonus I Monophthalmus tried to win them over during the Wars of the Diadochi.

At the Battle of Gabiene in 316 BC, they settled with Antigonus I Monophthalmus after he managed to take possession of their baggage train (consisting of their families and the result of forty years of plunder). One of their commanders, Teutamus, negotiated with Antigonus to obtain the return of their possessions, but in exchange delivered their general Eumenes to him.

Antigonus soon broke up the corps, finding it too turbulent to manage, also executing their other commander, Antigenes. Over the course of the Wars of the Diadochi, Antigonus had developed a severe hatred of the veteran unit due to almost dying in a mutiny caused by them, and also being crushed in battle by them multiple times. He sent them to Sibyrtius, the Macedonian satrap of Arachosia, with the order to dispatch them by small groups of two or three to dangerous missions so that their numbers would rapidly dwindle. However, others may have been retired to live in Macedonian settlements in Asia.

Polyaenus writes that Antigonus liberally rewarded the Argyraspides who brought him Eumenes as prisoner. But, in order to protect himself from future acts against him, he ordered a thousand of the Argyraspides to serve under Sibyrtius, while he isolated others by having them remain in garrisons in remote, uncultivated countries, eventually managing to get rid of them all this way.

Plutarch wrote that after Antigonus killed Eumenes, he sent the Argyraspides to Sibyrtius and ordered him to destroy them in every possible way.

== Seleucid Empire ==
The Seleucid kings of Syria employed an infantry phalangite corps of the same name. At the Battle of Raphia in 217 BC, the 10,000 men-strong Argyraspides took up positions opposite the Ptolemaic phalanx. They were men chosen from the whole kingdom and armed in the Macedonian manner. Their position beside the king at the Battle of Magnesia in 190 BC suggests that they were the premier infantry guard unit in the Seleucid army, while the right flank led by Antiochus, included 1,000 agema cavalry and 1,000 argyraspides of the royal guard. At the Daphne parade held by Antiochus IV Epiphanes in 166 BC, the Argyraspides were 5,000 strong. However, the corps of men described by Polybius as being armed and dressed in the "Roman fashion" numbered 5,000, and Bar-Kochva suggests that these men, who are described as being in the prime of life, might have also been a division of the Argyraspides, putting the number of the corps back up to 10,000 strong. Livy mentions a cavalry corps called argyraspides as a royal cohort in the army of Antiochus III the Great at Magnesia.

== Rome ==
The Roman Emperor Alexander Severus, among other ways in which he imitated Alexander the Great, had in his army men who were called argyraspides and chrysaspides (i.e. "golden shields").
