= Potima =

Area in Paphos, Cyprus

Potima (Greek: Πότιμα), also known as Potima Bay, is an area in Paphos, Cyprus. The name Potima is derived from the Greek word potizo (ποτίζω) because this area was the first that had water. Potima is situated near the village of Kissonerga and near the Coral Bay area in southwest Cyprus. The area is well connected by public transport and has several restaurants and a celebrated view. Potima Bay is also home to a sand beach with wind and swells sufficient to support water-sports such as surfing and kiteboarding.

A main road passes through Potima, connecting the north and south Paphos villages. Most of the Potima area is undeveloped government property. The land is irrigated for agricultural use and there are greenhouses, banana plantations and fruit orchards.

There are plans to start building a new project, Paphos Marina, in Potima Bay. The Paphos Marina, plans for which have slowly gained traction since its announcement in 2007, will be the first Marina in Paphos and is expected to be lucrative for the surrounding area through tourism revenue. The marina will be able to moor approximately 1000 vessels and will also contain residential housing, restaurants, bars, retail shops and leisure facilities.
