= Demetrius II =

Demetrius II or Demetrios II may refer to:

- Demetrius II Aetolicus (died 229 BC), king of Macedon
- Demetrius II of India (died ca. 150 BC)
- Demetrius II Nicator (died 125 BC), ruler of the Seleucid Empire
- Demetrius II of Abkhazia (ruled 837/38–872/73 AD)
- Demetrius II of Georgia (died 1289 AD)
- Demetrius I of Georgia (died 1156 AD)
- Pope Demetrius II of Alexandria, ruled in 1861–1870
- MV Demetrios II, a cargo ship wrecked in 1998
