= Polyniki =

Polyniki or Polynikis is a name. Notae leople with the name include:

- Polyniki Emmanouilidou
- Michalis Polynikis
