= Marios Joannou Elia =

Cypriot composer and artistic director

- Born: 19 June 1978 (age 48)
- Origin: Paphos, Cyprus
- Genres: contemporary music, multimedia
- Occupations: Composer, artistic director, lecturer
- Years active: 1998–present
- Website: mjelia.com

Marios Joannou Elia (born 19 June 1978), is a Cypriot composer and artistic director. He was the youngest director in the history of the European Capital of Culture (2013–15). He is ambassador in tourism of the Republic of Cyprus. Since 2016 he has been the director of the large-scale project "Sound of Vladivostok", on behalf of Zarya Foundation, in Russia; from January 2018, director of "Sound of Kyoto", on behalf of Kyoto City and Kyoto Arts and Culture Foundation after an invitation of the Agency for Cultural Affairs, Government of Japan.

== Education ==
Elia studied composition with Adriana Hölszky at the University of Music and Dramatic Arts Mozarteum, Salzburg. Further composition studies led him to Klaus Huber at the University of Music in Basel. He worked with artists like Bogusław Schaeffer and Michael Finnissy, as well as Georges Aperghis, Helmut Lachenmann and Karlheinz Stockhausen. He also studied musicology at the University of Music and Performing Arts Vienna. He holds a Doctor of Philosophy from the University of Southampton (2010).

== Career ==
From 2003 to 2006 he was artistic and scientific fellow in the composition department at Mozarteum.

Elia was the artistic director of the Multimedia-Event "autosymphonic" in Mannheim (2019–12) and "Ulmer Oratorium" in Ulm (2013–15).

Elia's compositional work comprises pieces from a wide range of genres and instrumentation from musical based plays to opera/music theatre and multimedia, instrumental and vocal works also with the inclusion of electronic media and an expansion of the musical material through unusual acoustic and visual elements.

His stage works have been produced by the Staatsoper Hannover, the Staatsoper Stuttgart, the Macedonian National Opera and ballet, the Theatre Rampe Stuttgart etc.

International orchestras and Ensembles like the SWR Symphony Orchestra Baden-Baden and Freiburg, SWR Vocal Ensemble Stuttgart, German Radio Philharmonic Saarbruecken-Kaiserslautern, Stuttgart State Orchestra, Sinfonietta of the Gewandhaus Orchestra Leipzig, Ensemble Modern, Moscow Contemporary Music Ensemble, Austrian Ensemble for Contemporary Music, Children's Choir of the Stuttgart State Opera, Netherlands Accordion Orchestra etc. have premiered his music.

Concert Halls and Festivals such as the Berlin Philharmonic and Warsaw Philharmonic, the Festpielhaus Hellerau in Dresden, the Queen's Hall in Edinburgh, the Muziekgebouw aan't IJ Amsterdam, the Millenáris Theatrum Budapest or the Ars Electronica Linz have presented Elia's music.

== Die Jagd ==
Elia composed several operas and musical theatre works. His last opera, "The Hunt", commissioned by the Staatsoper Stuttgart is composed for four singers, three actors, hunting chorus, two choruses, 20 recorded voices, instrumental ensemble into two groups, car sextet and electronics (2008). The work was premiered by the Stuttgart State Opera, in coproduction with the Theater Rampe Stuttgart.

== Autosymphonic ==
For the 125th birthday of the automobile, Elia composed the open-air multimedia symphony "autosymphonic", commissioned by the city of Mannheim. The one-hour-long symphony is scored for 265 musicians: for symphony orchestra, 81 cars and 120 percussionists, choir, children's choir, pop band, vocal ensemble, percussion octet, live electronics and a 360-degree sound system. There were 17 conductors involved in the performance. The premiere took place at the central square of Mannheim, Friedrichsplatz, and attracted an audience of 20,000 people [10]. Horst Hamann created the visual staging of the symphony.

After a ten-month 'car-casting', Elia created the world's first car orchestra. The 81 cars of all eras and types were played by 120 pupils as 'instruments'.

== Event culture ==
The work of Elia comprises compositions of different genres and instrumentations for the opera as well as for concert halls and goes up to visionary projects and concepts for complex and large-scale cultural events. A number of his works have been specifically designed for special occasions and celebrations, like the choral work "Aquanauts" (premiered in the gardens of the Salzburg Mirabell Palace, 2007) or the media opera "The Journey of G. Mastorna" (premiered in the Airport Salzburg during the "Mozart Year 2006") .

== Pop music ==
Elia composed the fourth part of "autosymphonic" for symphony orchestra, choir, percussion quintet and the singers and rappers of the German pop band Söhne Mannheims and Xavier Naidoo. The title of the song is called "The Dream" [aka "The Automobile" or "500 horses"].

== Compositions (selection) ==
- Victory and Triumph, for soprano, choir, symphony orchestra and drums, Commissioned by Olympiacos, Karaiskakis Stadium (2020)
- Πονεμένες Παναγίες (Weeping Madonnas), large-scale oratorio, Commissioned by the Presidency of the Republic of Cyprus (2018–20)
- Trumpet of God, for trumpet solo, choir and large symphony orchestra, Commissioned by Pannon Philharmonic (2019–20)
- Matryoshka, for the world's largest matryomin ensemble, Guinness World Record (Kobe), Commissioned by Mandarin Electron Japan (2019)
- Humanoid, for large symphony orchestra and humanoid, Commissioned by Osaka University (2019)
- Sound of Kyoto, Commissioned by the Agency for Cultural Affairs, Government of Japan, Kyoto Arts and Culture Foundation, Kyoto City, Kyoto Art Centre (2018)
- Pleorama, for choir, violin and piano four hands, Text "Vor lauter Lauschen und Staunen sei still" by Rainer Maria Rilke, Commissioned by Internationale Gesellschaft für Polyästhetische Erziehung (2017)
- Telenauten, for speaking choir (6 actors), Text by Wolfgang Welsch, Commissioned by Internationale Gesellschaft für Polyästhetische Erziehung (2017)
- Naval Symphony, for soprano, tenor, symphony orchestra, choir and children's choir (2016–17). Commissioned for the Eastern Economic Forum. Commissioned by Primorje Philharmonic Society.
- Sound of Vladivostok, for theremin, electric guitar, church bells, symphony orchestra, brass band, three choirs, children's choir, snare drum squad, Korean drum ensemble, electric violin trio, pop band, recorded sounds, etc. (2016–17). Commissioned by the City of Vladivostok and Zarya Contemporary Arts Centre
- Abschied, for soprano, tenor, choir, violoncello I-II, guitar solo and guitar orchestra (2016). Composed for Mozarteum University of Salzburg
- Salz and Pfeffer, for guitar quartet (2016)
- Ulmer Oratorium, open air oratorio for 400 musicians (10 soloists, philharmonic orchestra, brass orchestra, 7 choirs, bell orchestra, various percussion ensembles, construction workshop ensemble, electronics) (2013–14). Composed for Ulm Minster
- Autosymphonic, open air multimedia symphony for 290 musicians (symphony orchestra, choir, children's choir, car orchestra, 120 percussionists and percussion octet, pop band, electronics) (2010–11). Composed for the City of Mannheim
- Man and Machine, for choir (2010–11)
- Im Auto über Land, for children's choir (2010)
- Autotrio, for three cars, 14 percussionists and electronics (2009)
- Vertumnus, for electronic music and interactive shadow play (2009)
- Airdance, for robotic orchestra (2009), Ars Electronica
- Nichts. Als Wiederholung, opera in 10 scenes for 7 soloists, choir, percussion sextet and chamber orchestra (2008–09)
- Die Jagd, opera in 16 scenes for 7 soloists, youth choir, speaking choir, chamber orchestra, auto sextet, electronics (2008), Staatsoper Stuttgart
- Elpis, for accordion orchestra (2008)
- Dornen, for large orchestra (2007/09)
- Akanthai, for chamber orchestra (2007)
- Staubzucker, for guitar quartet (2007)
- En Plo, for contrabass clarinet, double bass, electronics and loudspeaker orchestra (2007)
- Thalatta, Thalatta!, for mandolin and ensemble (2007)
- Aquanauten, for vocal ensemble (2007)
- Der Flötenzauberflöte, opera (2006)
- Die Reise des G. Mastorna, opera (2006). Composed for Salzburg Airport
- Versteckspiel, for quintet (2006)
- Kinderspiel, for soprano, mezzo-soprano and ensemble (2006)
- C Story, for mixed western and non-western instruments (2006)
- Spiegel:Eye for instrumental ensemble, 11 loudspeakers and live electronics (2006)
- Der Wegweiser, for sinfonietta (2005)
- Drei Löffel Zucker im Meer, für vocal ensemble (2005)
- Tempus Tantum Nostrum Est, for vocal ensemble and motorbikes Harley Davidson (2005)
- Debate, for ensemble (2005)
- As time goes by, Zeitoper (2005), Staatsoper Hannover
- Tessera, for recorder duet und double bass trio (2004)
- Holy Bread, for string quartet (violin solo and string trio) (2004)
- Whiteblack, for baritone and ensemble (2003/05)
- Strophes, for 11 singers, instrumental ensemble, loudspeaker ensemble and electronics (2003/04). Composed for the Transparent Factory
- With a Pair of Scissors and a Thousand Threads, for violin and one guitarist simultaneously performing on two guitars (2002), Cambridge University

== Books ==
During the composition of "Strophes" (2003), in which the architectonic features of a high-tech factory influenced various parameters of the work such as the production of sounds, Marios Joannou Elia developed the concept of polymediality. This involved two dimensions: the work-immanent compositional dimension and polymediality in the process of staging. The prefix poly denotes a qualitative paradigm shift; not a quantitative much, but a qualitative, polyaesthetic more. Written between 2007 and 2010 as a commentary focused on his opera "Die Jagd" (2008) and the orchestral piece "Akanthai" (2009), his book "The Concept of Polymediality" - published by Schott Music (2017) - illuminates Elia's concept of polymediality and, by providing a wealth of examples, how literary sources become an inherent polymedial element of his music. At the same time, the commentary elucidates a series of fundamental aspects of the music, including the model of imitative interaction, the concept of permanent fleetingness, the concept of polyaesthestics, and the question of musico-literary intermediality.

== Albums ==
"Staubzucker" is an album of nine works, composed between 1999 and 2008, by Marios Joannou Elia. The album, which was recorded at the ORF RadioKulturhaus in Vienna, was released in November 2015. The compositional style of the works on this recording varies in terms of their musical substance and behaviour, expressing the composer's distinctive musical values: his breadth of vision, technical craft, rhythmic drive, movement and gesture, and his profound expressivity and meta-theatricality, which have a spirit of restlessness and unexpectedness – often achieved through compositional techniques invented by Elia himself. The recording is neither typical contemporary music nor is it a mainstream classical guitar album, but it offers a manifestation of the endless possibilities of the guitar.

== Awards ==
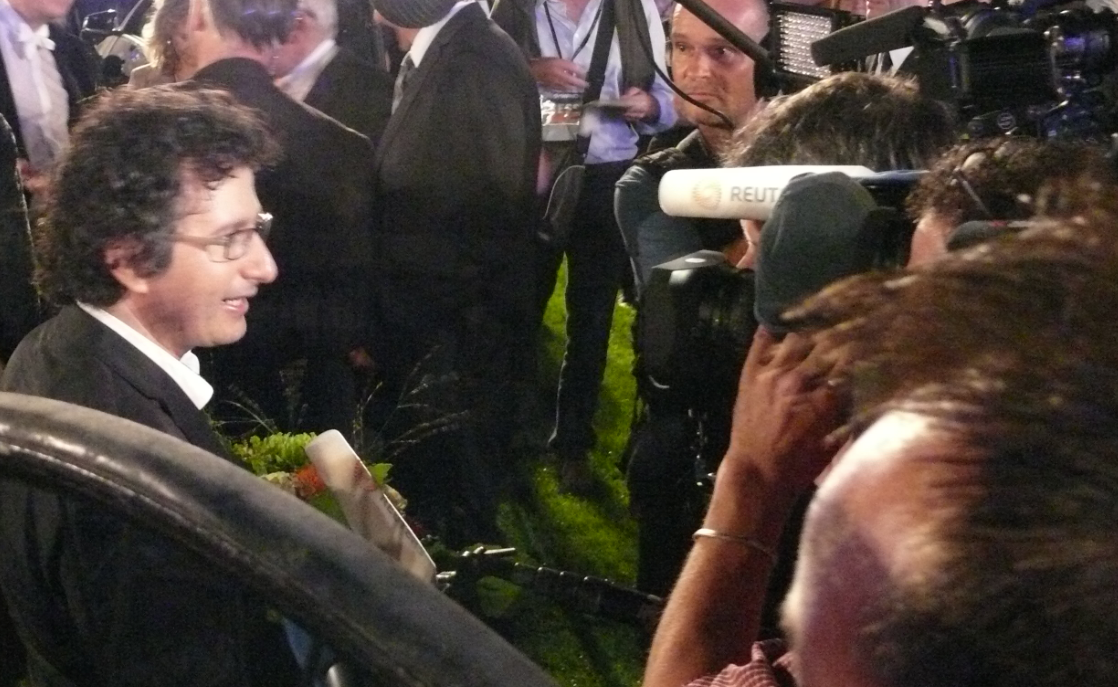
Marios Joannou Elia, Mannheim 2011

The Austrian Federal Ministry for Education, Arts and Culture in Vienna honoured him with a special Grant Award as the best student at Mozarteum during the academic year 2001/02. Furthermore, he was honoured with the Academic Excellence Award from the Chancellor of Mozarteum. He also received numerous awards from such institutions as the A.G. Leventis Foundation Paris, the European Centre for the Arts Hellerau in Dresden, the Hinrichsen Foundation London, the Academy of Arts Berlin, the Federal Chancellery of the Republic of Austria, the Allianz Cultural Foundation Munich, the Art-Foundation Baden-Württemberg, the Otto-Mauer-Fonds in Vienna, the Academy Schloss Solitude and the Republic of Cyprus.

The premiere of "With a Pair of Scissors and Thousand Threads" by the Cambridge University New Music Society (2002) was among the first international successes he achieved. Another early success was the performance of "Antidoron" (Holy Bread) for electronically amplified string quartet: First Prize at the Lutosławski Award international composition competition in Warsaw (2004). The premiere followed in the Warsaw Philharmonic with the Rubinstein Quartet.

Subsequently, Elia was awarded a number of international composition prizes: First Prize at the Edison Denisov competition in Moscow, First Prize and PWM Edition's Special Prize at the Kazimierz Serocki competition in Warsaw, First Prize "Recherche" awarded by the Mozarteum Salzburg, the Klangspuren Festival in Schwaz, Tyrol and the ensemble recherche Freiburg, the Patronize Award of the BMW Musica Viva and the Bavarian Radio in Munich, the HofKlang First Prize of the Society for Arts and Critics Leipzig etc.

In 2007 he was awarded the Theodor-Koerner-Fonds Composition Prize and lauded by the Austrian Federal President in Vienna. In 2009 he was awarded the Achievement Award by the Minister of Culture in Cyprus. In 2010 he was voted "Artist of the Year" in Cyprus and elected President of the "New Works" Music Festival in Southampton.

The album "Staubzucker" (released 2015) wins 3 Gold Medals at the Global Music Awards 2016 in California – in the categories Classical Contemporary, Album, Creativity and Originality.

He got the 1st World Award in the 2012 International InterArtia Festival Competition (International Art Society, Volos, Greece) and he is an honorary Member of the International Art Academy in Volos, Greece.

In 2018 he has received seven awards in Russia for his artistic contribution and work - among others from the Mayor of Vladivostok and the Government of Primorye. In 2019 he was awarded "Most Successful Person of the Republic of Cyprus" in the Category Culture and Art.
