= MV Demetrios II =

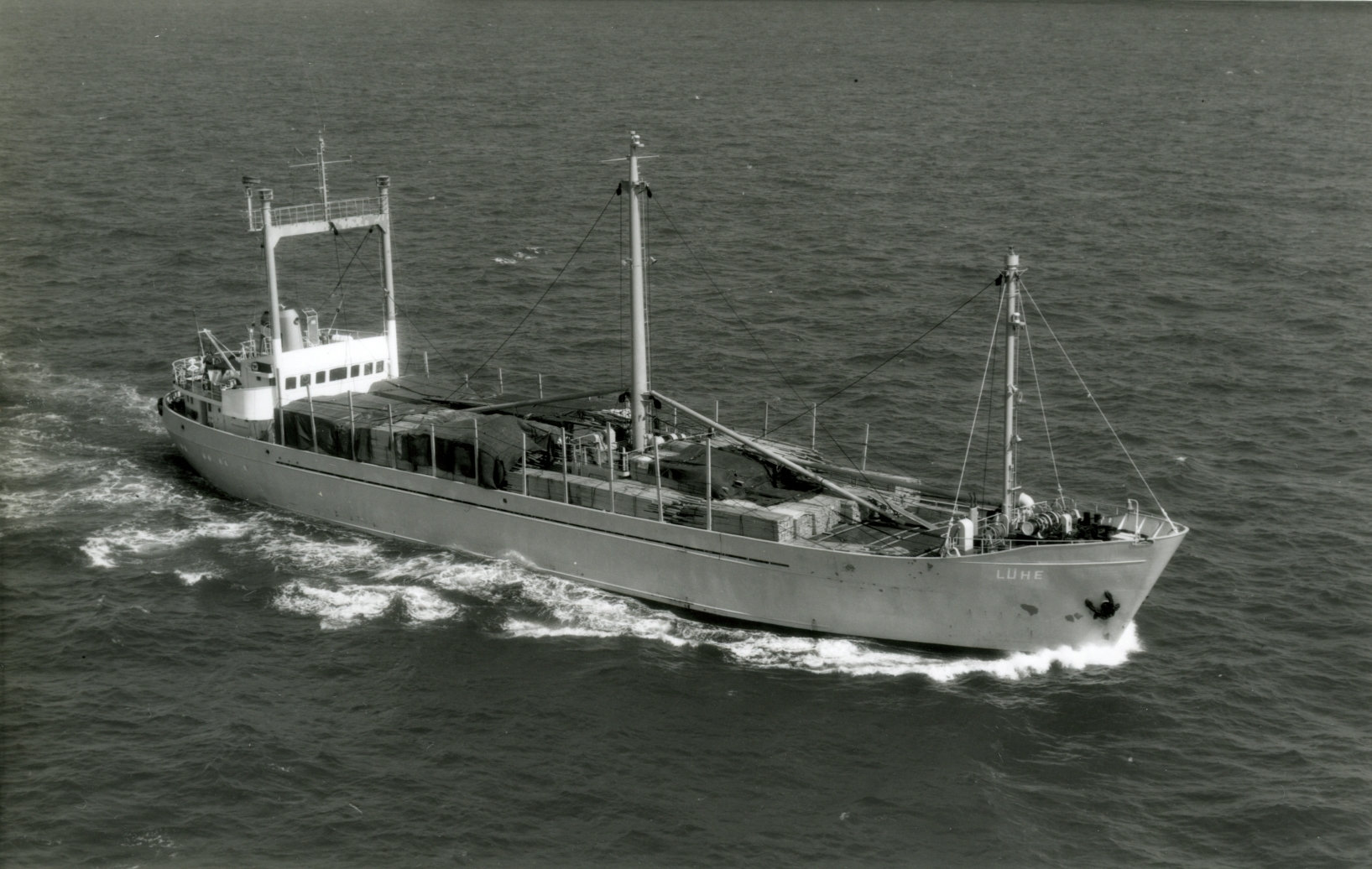
- Demetrios II as Lühe

History
- Name: Arn X (1964-1970); Lühe (1970-1976); Tor Nordia (1976-1978); Luhedeich (1978-1987); Sofia S (1987-1988); Anastasia (1988-1996); Demetrios II (1996-1998)
- Owner: Silver Star Shipping
- Port of registry: Honduras
- Builder: J.J. Sietas K.G. Schiffswerft Gmbh, Hamburg
- Launched: 1964
- Maiden voyage: 1964
- In service: 1964
- Identification: IMO number: 6504046
- Fate: Ran aground (wrecked) close to Paphos on 23 March 1998

General characteristics
- Type: General cargo ship
- Tonnage: 875 GRT
- Length: 66 m (217 ft)
- Beam: 10.5 m (34 ft)
- Draught: 4.2 m (14 ft)
- Propulsion: 6 cyl. 4 stroke diesel engine
- Speed: 9.5 knots

Demetrios II
- Interactive map of Demetrios II
- Coordinates: 34°47′15.1″N 32°23′11.8″E

The MV Demetrios II, also known as Dimitrios II, was a cargo ship, built in 1964 by J. J. Sietas at their shipbuilding yard in Hamburg-Neuenfelde, Germany. The ship ran aground off the coast of the Mediterranean island of Cyprus in 1998.

== Paphos accident ==
The Honduran-flagged M/V Demetrios II ran aground off Paphos Lighthouse on 23 March 1998 in heavy seas, during a voyage from Greece to Syria with a cargo of timber.

At the time of the accident, the ship had eight crew members: 4 Greeks, 2 Pakistanis and 2 Syrians. The crew were rescued and airlifted to safety of Paphos by a British military helicopter.

It was subsequently confirmed in the journal Lloyd's List that the seafaring certificates of competency for the Greek captain and the Pakistani first officer had been forged.

The wreck can clearly be seen whilst traveling along the center of Paphos to Coral Bay Road.

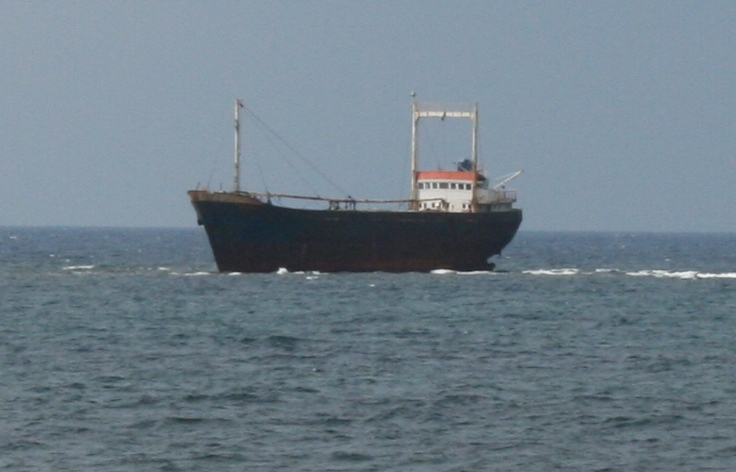
The grounded wreck viewed from the coast.

After several decades of abandonement, the ship's hull has been significantly eroded by rust.

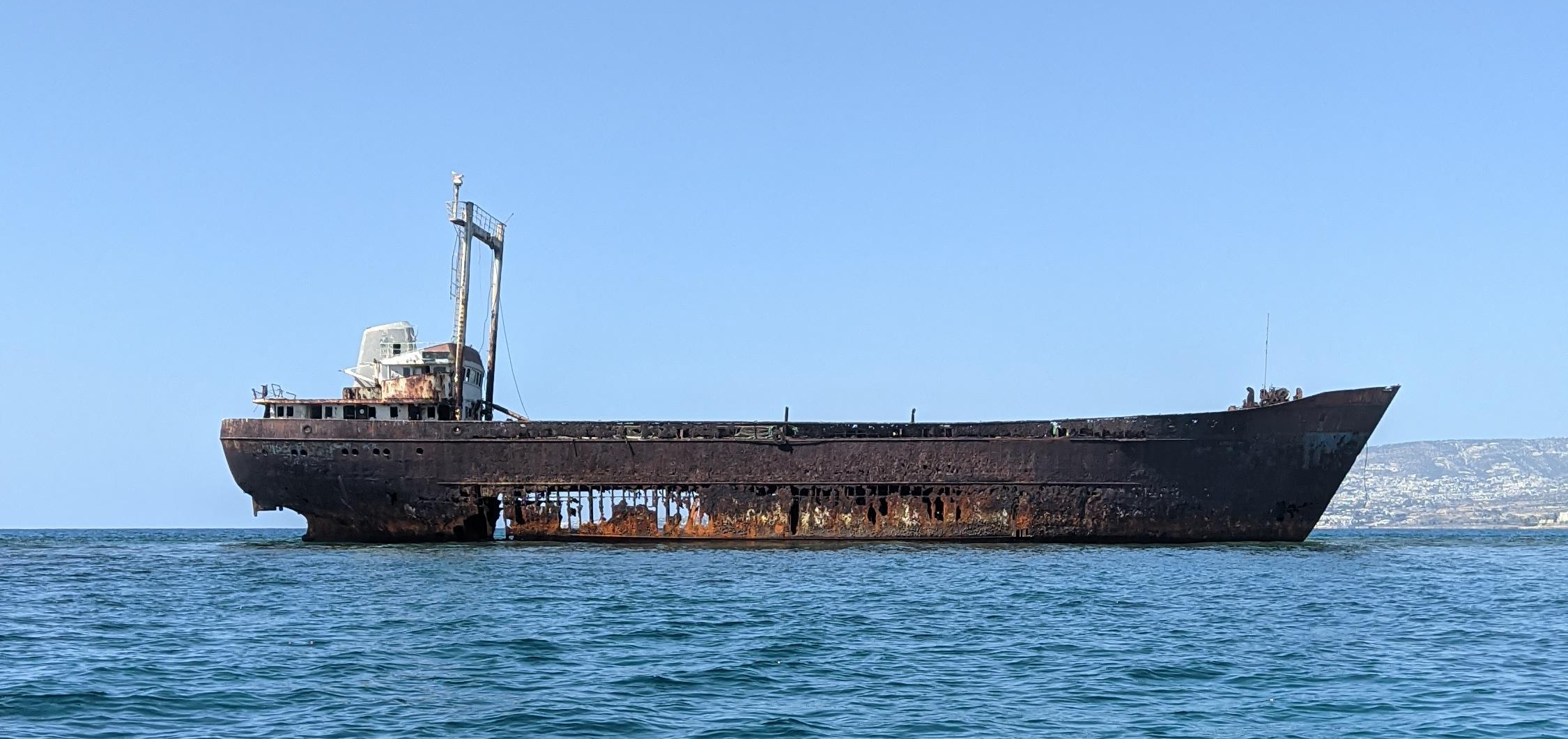
A picture of the significantly eroded shipwreck viewed from on the water in 2024.

== See also ==
- EDRO III, another shipwreck grounded nearby in 2011.
