= EDRO III =

Ship built in 1966

Coordinates: 34°52′22.98″N 32°20′21.50″E

History
- Name: Baltique (1966-1975); Sunnmore (1975-1985); Hvitanes (1985-2001); Ljosafoss(2001-2003); Kosmas (2003-2008); Edro III (2008-2011)
- Port of registry: Sierra Leone
- Builder: Kaldnes Mekaniske Verksted at Tønsberg in Norway
- Launched: 1966
- Identification: IMO number: 6613316
- Fate: Ran aground (wrecked) close to Pegeia on 11 December 2011

General characteristics
- Type: General cargo ship
- Tonnage: 2,517 GRT
- Length: 83 m (272 ft)
- Beam: 14 m (46 ft)
- Draught: 3.8 m (12 ft)

EDRO III was a cargo ship that ran aground in Cyprus on 8 December 2011.

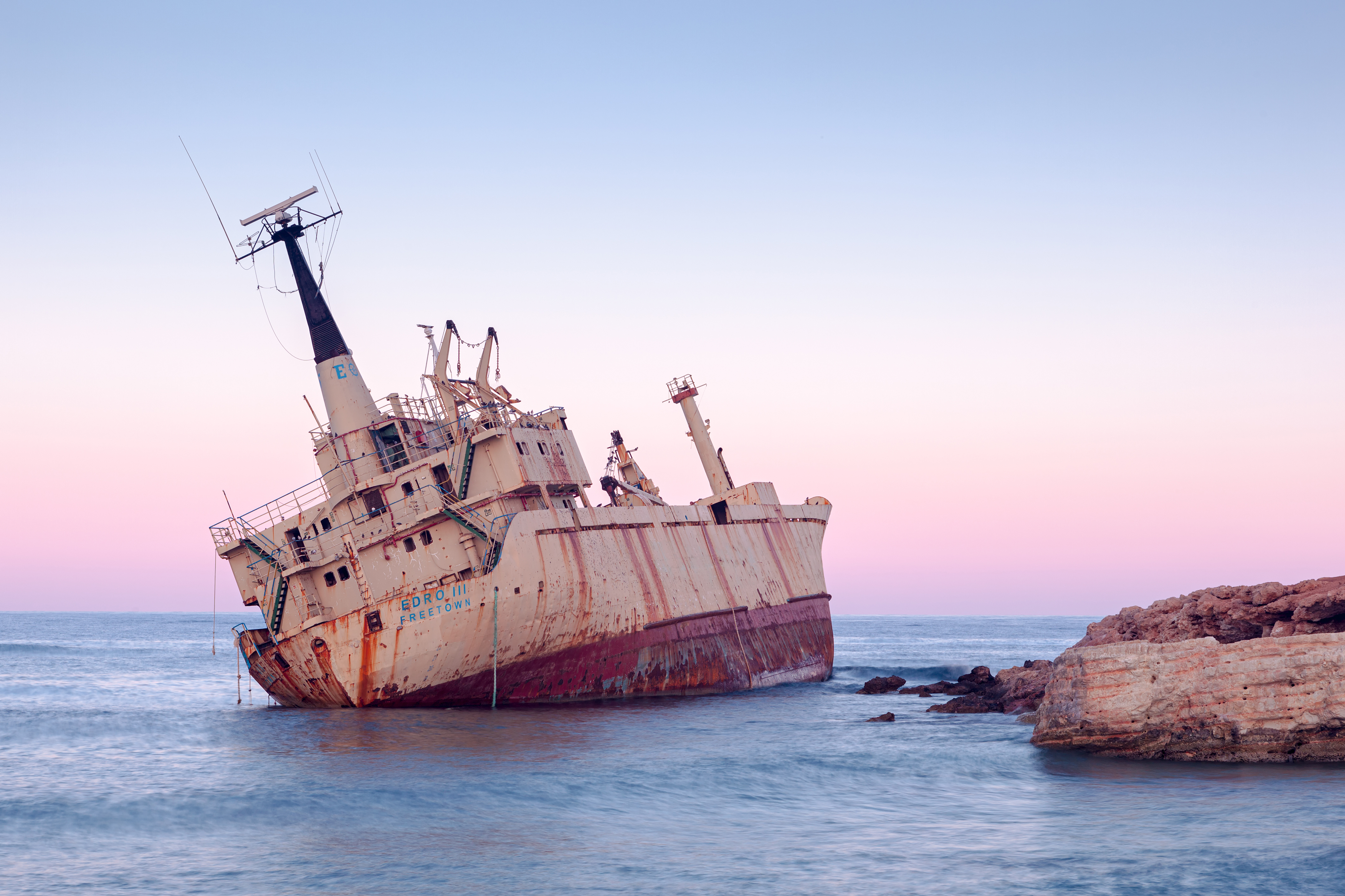
The shipwreck as seen from the rear

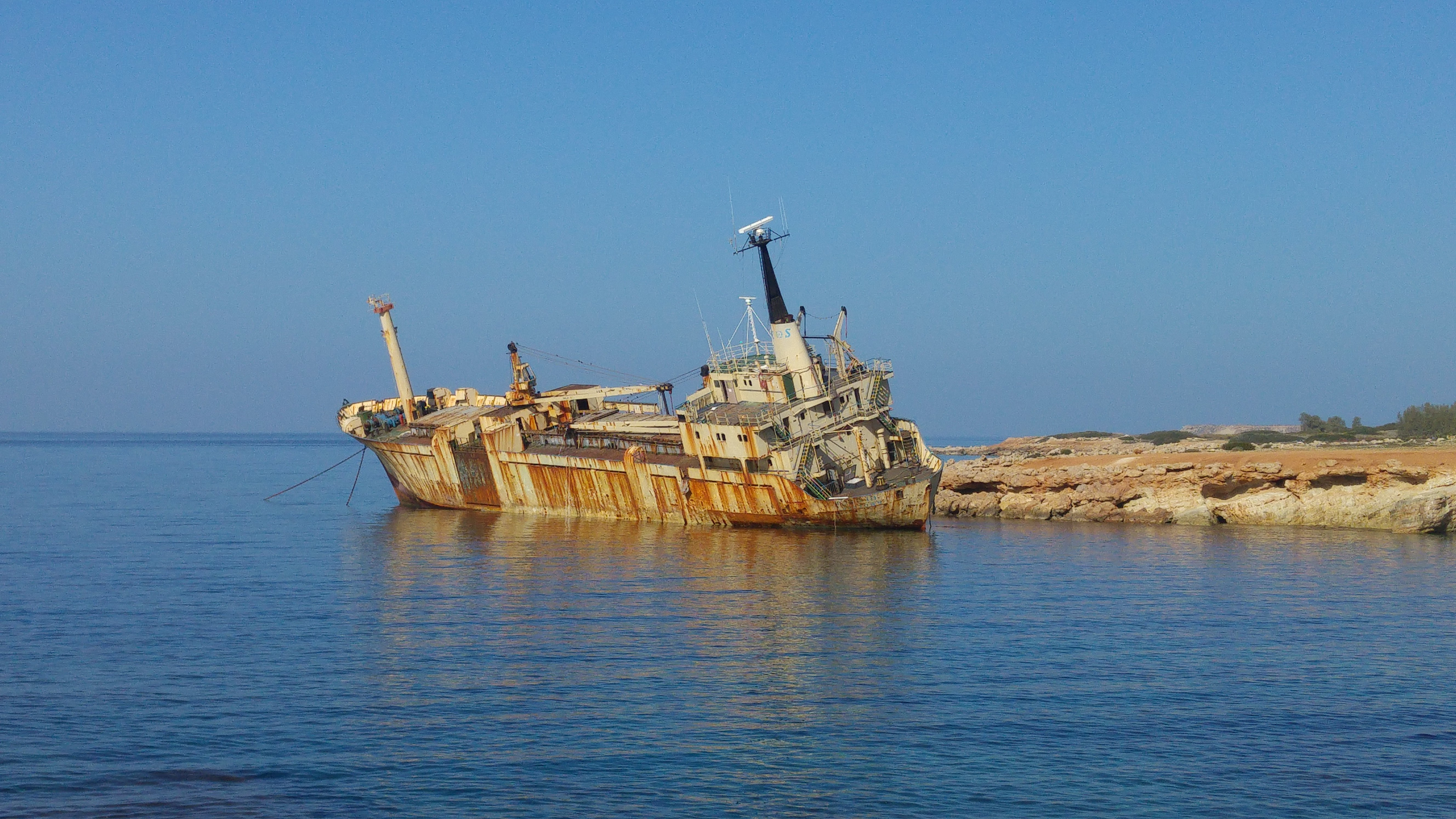
MV EDRO III, Paphos, Cyprus

== Ship ==
EDRO III was an Albanian-owned cargo ship, registered in Sierra Leone. It was built in the 1960s.

== Paphos accident ==
EDRO III ran aground off Pegeia on 8 December 2011 in heavy seas, during a voyage to Rhodes, from Limassol, Cyprus with a cargo of plasterboard. At the time of the accident, the ship had nine crew members – seven Albanians and two Egyptians. The crew were rescued and airlifted to the safety of Paphos by a local British Military helicopter.

The EDRO III is more than 80 metres (260 ft) in length, weighing about 2,300–2500 tons. The ship lies on the sea rocks at an angle of 11–12 degrees near the sea cave area. Together with Germany's CIMEXTA Vessel Salvage Company, the task of safe removal of all diesel, hydrocarbons and marine pollutants on board the vessel, and making the hull watertight was awarded to a Cypriot marine salvage company. This was completed in October 2013.

Peyia Municipality which is the regional administrative authority where Edro III resides has mentioned that there were several studies and attempts to tow the shipwreck, all of which were abandoned due to the difficulty of the project. There are officially no current plans for its removal.

== Nearby shipwrecks ==
There is another shipwreck nearby. The wrecked MV Demetrios II is located near the Tombs of the Kings archaeological site.
