= Kissonerga =

Kissonerga Κισσόνεργα
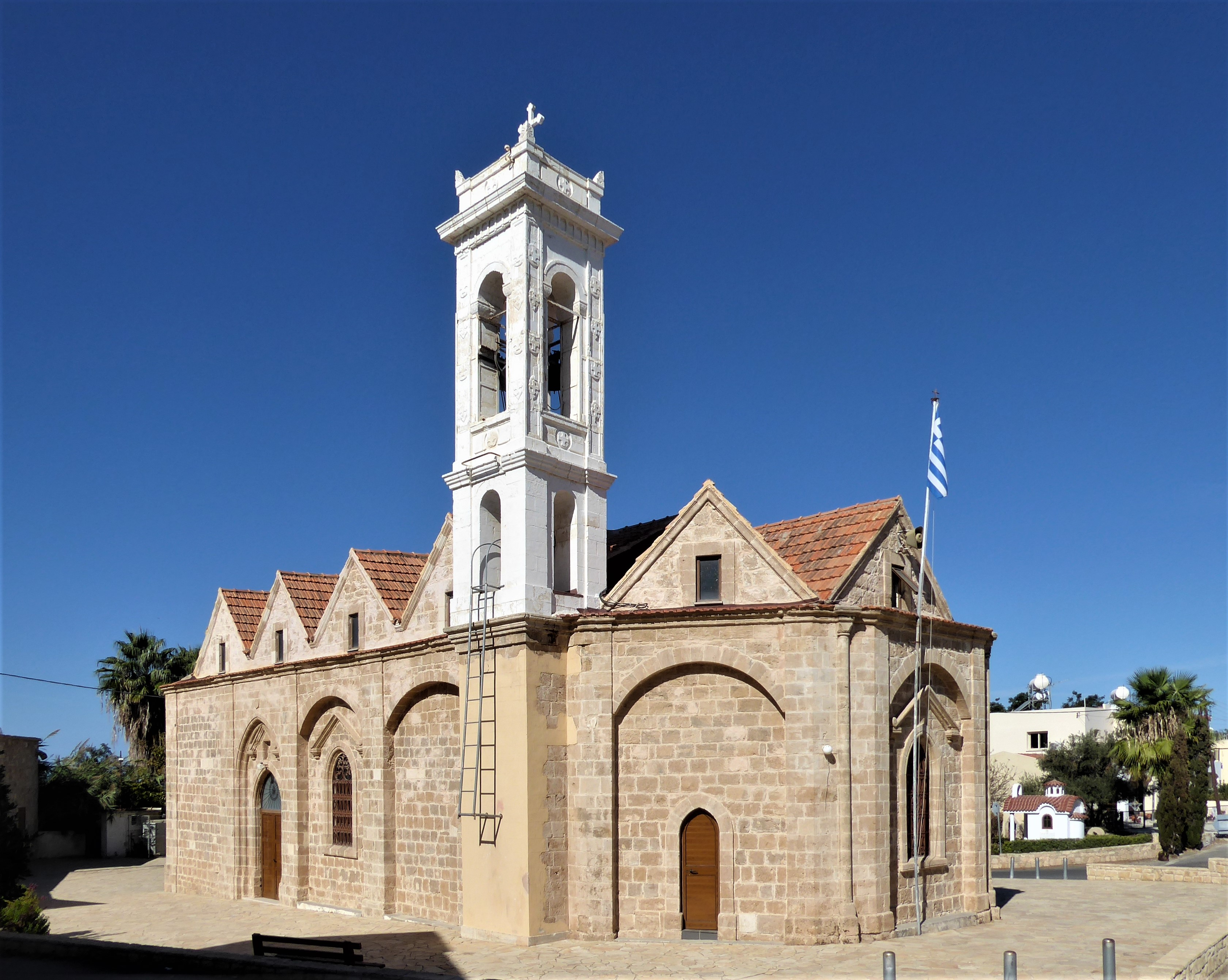

- Location within Cyprus
- Coordinates: 34°49′21″N 32°24′09″E
- Country: Cyprus
- District: Paphos District
- Elevation: 112 m (367 ft)

Population (2001)
  - Total: 2,505
- Time zone: UTC+2 (EET)
  - Summer (DST): UTC+3 (EEST)
- Postal code: 8574

Kissonerga is a village in southwest Cyprus, about 8 km north of Paphos, in a region notable its banana plantations in an area known as the Ktima Lowlands. In 1980, the village had a population of 700 people.

Kissonerga is about eight kilometres down the main road from Paphos towards Coral Bay. Along the coast road are several hotels, mini-markets, numerous bars and taverns, as well as small complexes of shops mainly catering for tourists. The village is located 112 metres above sea level.

Away from the coast road, Kissonerga village has a main street where there are restaurants, several mini-markets, two banks, two coffee shops (one of which also operates as a sub post office), a bookshop, florist, chemist and hairdressers. There is also an internet café near the playground. Kissonerga has a collection of renowned holiday homes named Julipapas Gardens offering accommodation to tourists and is signposted off the coastal road.

At the far end of the main street, opposite the school, which caters for children from nursery age to 11 years old, there is a communal area which is mainly used as a playground. Bordering this area is a monument dedicated to two young men of the village, Christos Miltiadous Kkelis (23) and Georgios Michalis (17) who were members of EOKA (National Organisation of Cypriot Fighters) and who died for their cause. The inscriptions read - ΑΓΩΝΙΣΤΗΣ ΤΗΣ ΕΟΚΑ 1955-59 ΕΠΕΣΕ ΜΑΧΟΜΕΝΟΣ ΥΠΕΡ ΠΙΣΤΕΩΣ ΚΑΙ ΠΑΤΡΙΔΟΣ (EOKA FIGHTER OF 1955-59 - FELL FIGHTING FOR FAITH AND HOMELAND). The main street that runs through Kissonerga is named after Christos Kkelis (see Google maps) and a smaller adjacent road is named after his father Miltiades Kkelis (also on Google maps) as it was the location of the Kkelis family home.

EOKA started a guerrilla campaign against British colonial rule and aimed at union with Greece (Enosis) on 1 April 1955. The campaign lasted until 1959 and caused the deaths of more Greek Cypriot civilians than British colonialists. It created civil strife and mistrust between the two Cypriot communities. The first British soldier to be killed in the conflict, Lance Corporal A. R. L. Milne, was killed in Kissonerga when a bomb was thrown into his vehicle.

Across the road from the playground is the Church of the Transfiguration (also known as Metamorphosis) and not far from this church are the ruins of a tiny chapel dedicated to Saints Zinovia and Filonilli. Although of modern architecture, the church the icons from the church of 1775 are preserved. These two saints accompanied St Paul to Paphos to help spread Christianity. They died and were buried in Kissonerga.

To the north of Kissonerga a new football stadium has recently been built in amongst the numerous plantations of bananas. Before the advent of European Union directives, Kissonerga was awash with these thriving plantations, but now many of them have fallen into decay as the bananas produced did not fit the exacting criteria that allowed them to be exported to other parts of the EU.

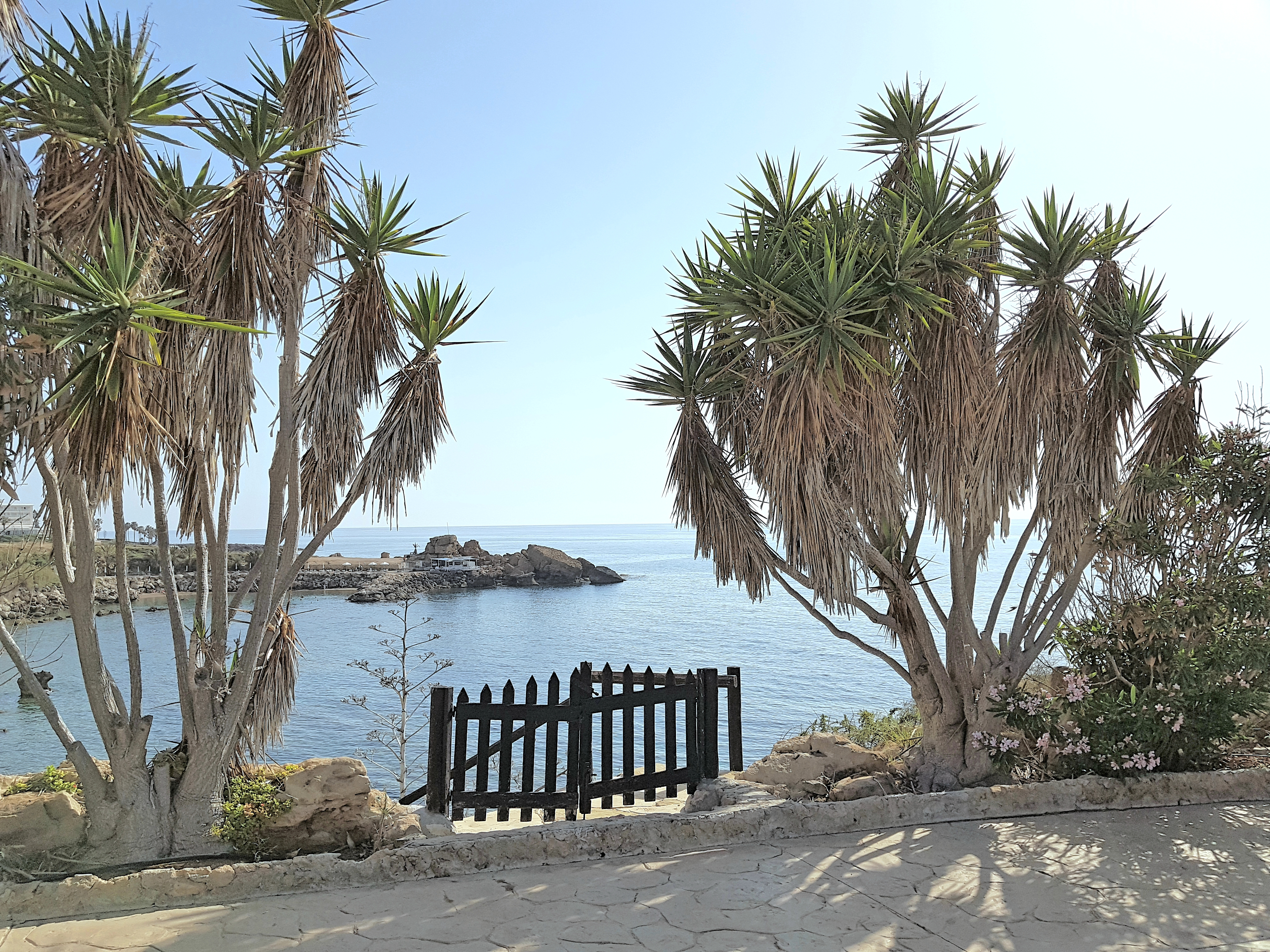

Among the establishments to be found in Kissonerga, are a horse-riding centre and the boat yard which sells, repairs and services boats of all shapes and sizes.

Construction of Paphos Marina was long planned for the Potima Bay area, located to the north of Kissonerga. The marina will be the largest in the Eastern Mediterranean and will have a capacity to accommodate 1.000 vessels. Construction began in 2009.

== Myluthkia ==
To the north of Kissonerga a rare settlement of the Chalcolithic culture characteristic of the Paphos region, which lasted for about a millennium (3500-2500 BCE), has been discovered. The site is an important settlement and evidence suggests that a powerful fertility goddess was worshipped here, who protected childbirth and infants. Among the many artefacts found was a clay figurine of a woman, in the midst of childbirth, seated on a stool as well as a unique limestone statuette representing a pregnant woman with a phallic neck.

The village consisted of clusters of round houses (some of which have been reconstructed on the site) built of stone and mud and with no defensive walls. Its inhabitants lived on hunting, fishing, herding and the gathering and growing various plants. They made tools of stone, bone and deer antler and knew how to make pottery, stone and wood carving, weaving, and basketry. They also used a few small copper objects.

Expert analysis of human remains found at the site confirm the existence of thalassaemia, a blood disorder which affects the production of haemoglobin and results in severe anaemia. The disorder is passed from parent to child via genes and is the most common inherited blood disorder in the world. Thalassaemia is particularly prevalent in people from Mediterranean countries and a broad region extending across the Middle East and South East Asia.
