= Michalis Polynikis =

Cypriot politician

Michalis Polynikis (born 6 November 1948 in Paphos) is a Cypriot politician. Between 29 February 2008 and 2 March 2010 he was the Minister of Agriculture and Environment in Cyprus.
