= Paphos =

Paphos Πάφος (Greek) Baf (Turkish) Pafos
- City and municipality
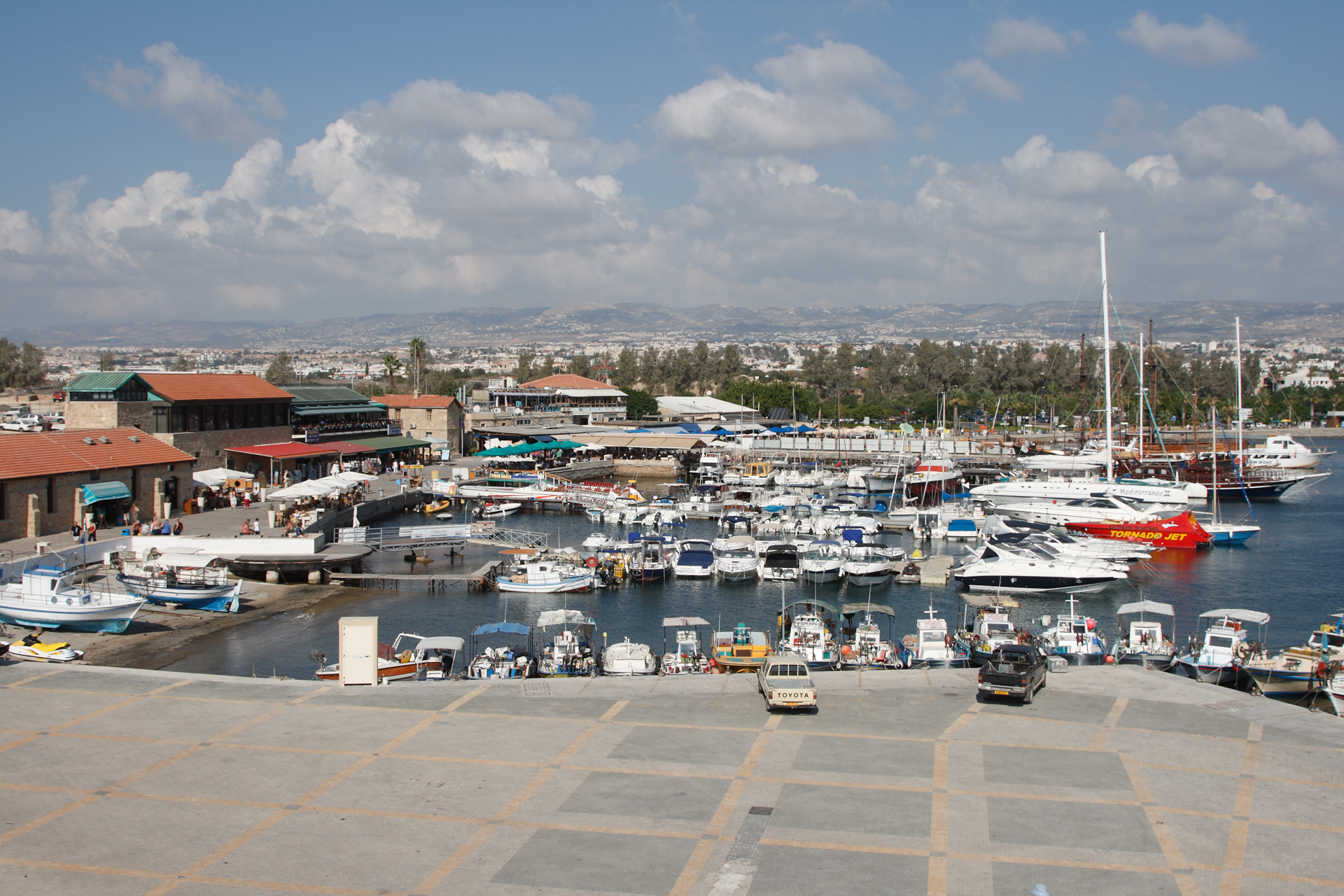
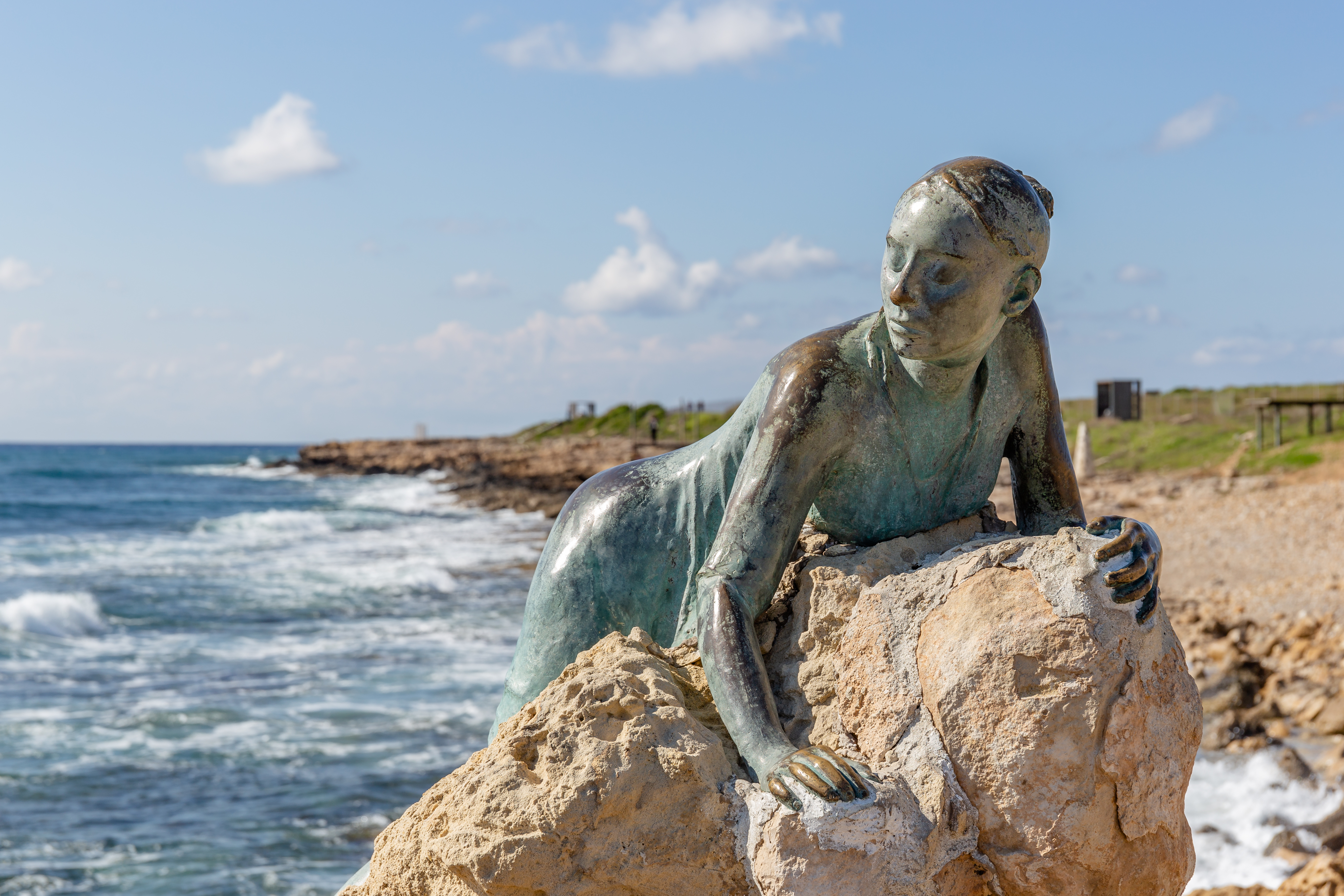
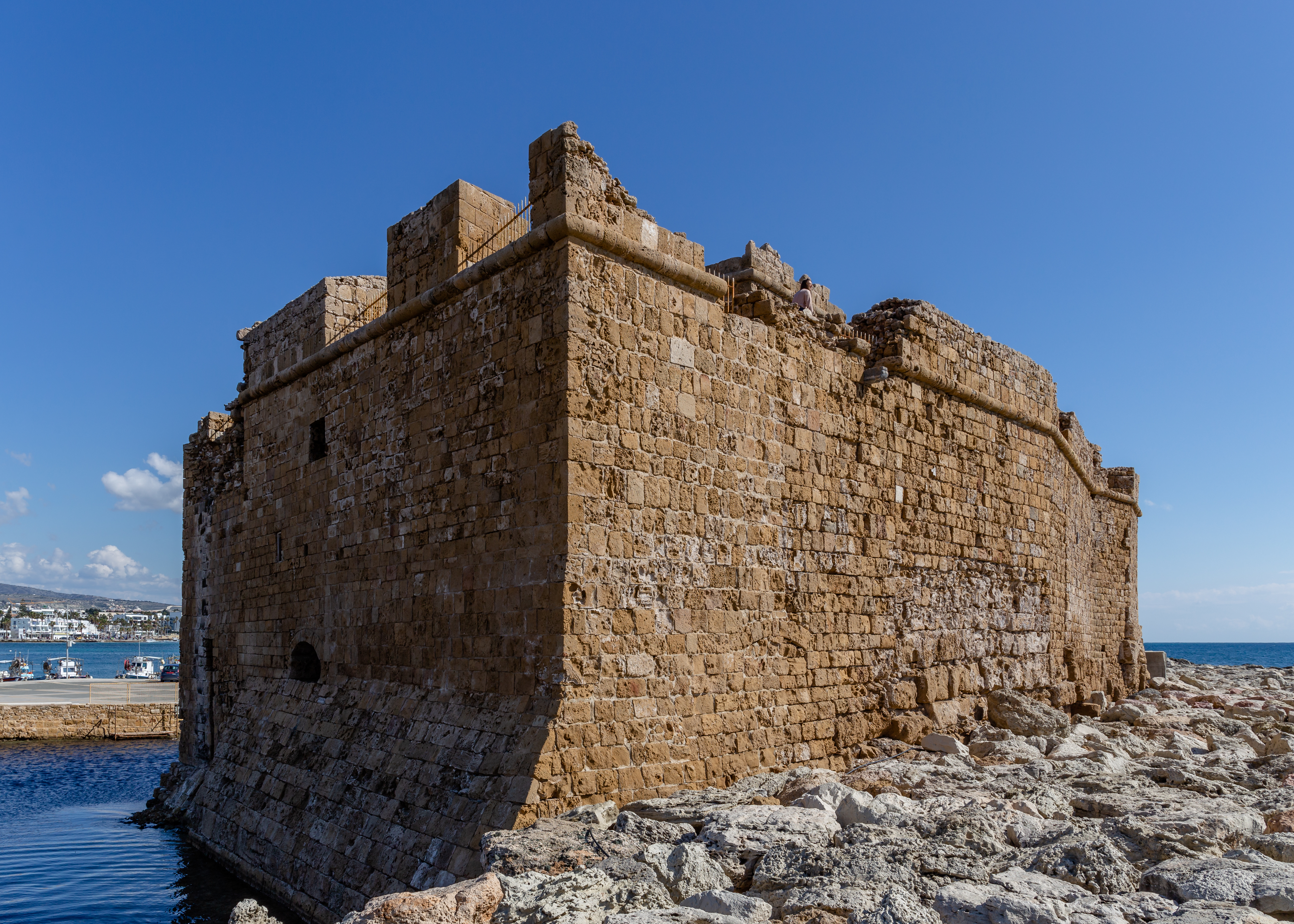
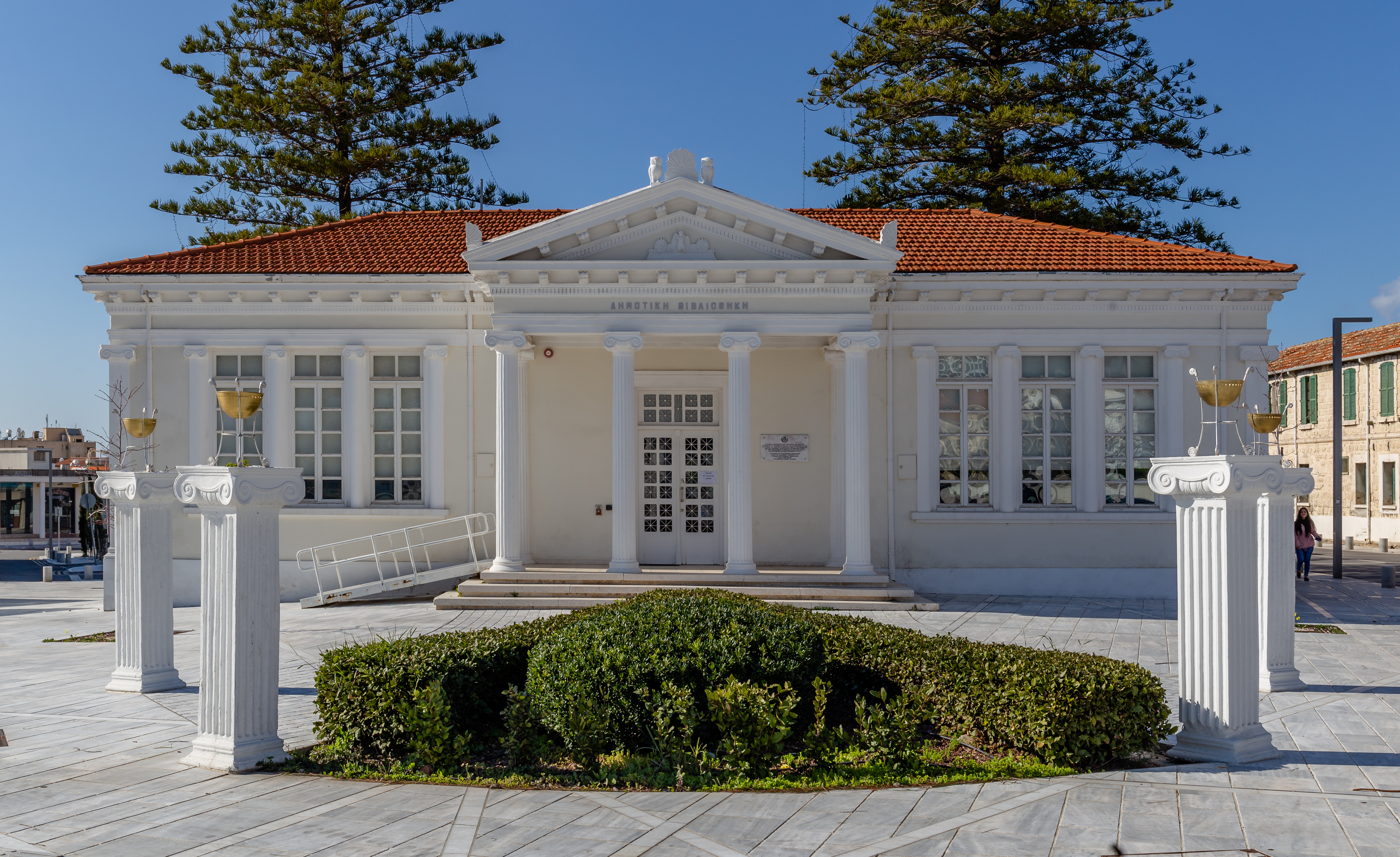
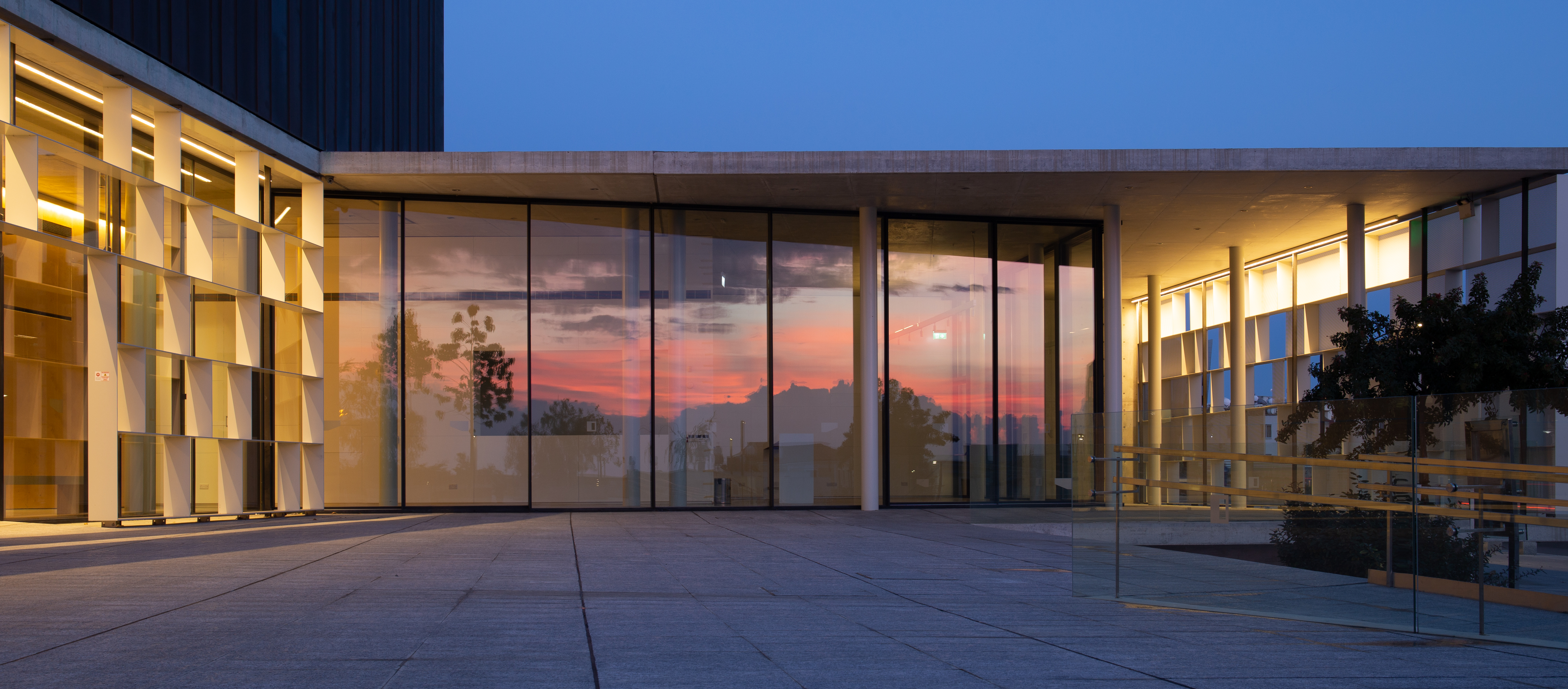
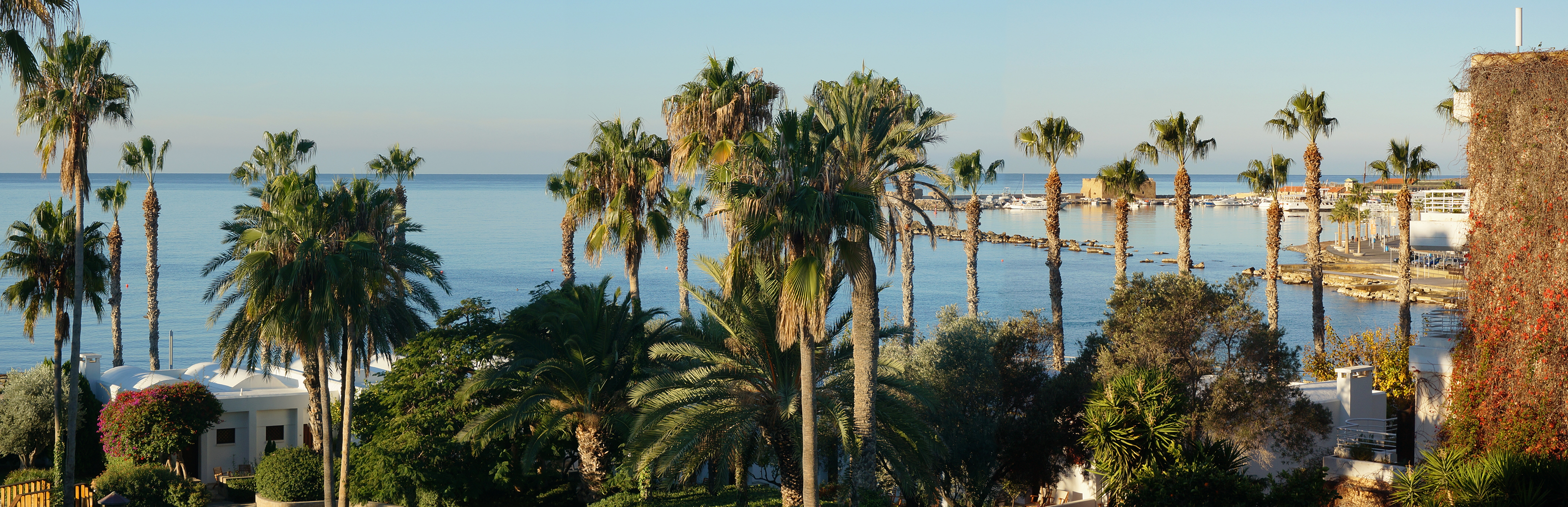
- Port of Paphos Modern Aphrodite Sculpture Paphos Castle Municipal Library Markideio Theatre View of Paphos
- Interactive map of Paphos
- Location within Cyprus Location within the European Union
- Coordinates: 34°46′N 32°25′E
- Country: Cyprus
- District: Paphos District

Government
  - Mayor: Phedonas Phedonos (DISY)

Area
  - Municipality: 16.95 km^{2} (6.54 sq mi)
  - Urban: 93.26 km^{2} (36.01 sq mi)
- Elevation: 75 m (246 ft)

Population (2021)
  - Municipality: 37,297
  - Rank: 6th municipality, 4th urban in Cyprus
  - Urban: 55,000
  - Urban density: 590/km^{2} (1,500/sq mi)
  - District: 100,175
- Demonym(s): Paphian(s) (en); Pafitis, (masc.), Pafitissa (fem.) (gr), Baflı (tr)
- Time zone: UTC+2 (EET)
  - Summer (DST): UTC+3 (EST)
- Post code: 8010-8049
- Area code: 26
- Major airport(s): Paphos International Airport
- Website: pafos.org.cy

UNESCO World Heritage Site
- Criteria: Cultural: iii, vi
- Reference: 79
- Inscription: 1980 (4th Session)
- Area: 162.0171 ha (400.353 acres)

Paphos, (Note: /ˈpæfɒs/ PAF-oss; Greek: Πάφος [ˈpafos]; Turkish: Baf;) also spelled Pafos, is a coastal city in southwest Cyprus and the capital of the Paphos District. In classical antiquity, two locations were known as Paphos: Old Paphos in modern Kouklia and Nea Paphos, both of which were at various times the capital of the ancient city-state of Paphos. It is the fourth-largest city in the country, after Nicosia, Limassol, and Larnaca, with a population of 35,961.

The modern city of Paphos lies on the Mediterranean coast, about 50 km (30 mi) west of Limassol, the island's largest port; the two cities are connected by the A6 highway. Paphos International Airport is the country's second-largest airport, and serves as a gateway to western and southern Cyprus. The city has a subtropical-Mediterranean climate, and experiences the mildest temperatures on the island.

Paphos was counted as one of the "city-kingdoms of Cyprus" in antiquity. UNESCO inscribed the ruins of ancient Paphos as a World Heritage Site in 1980 under criterion (iii) for its unique testimony to a vanished civilization and criterion (vi) for its direct association with events or traditions of outstanding universal value. The Paphos World Heritage Site is managed by the Cyprus Department of Antiquities.

== Geography ==
Paphos is the most seismically active region in Cyprus, according to historical data which shows evidence of several strong earthquakes, some of which caused severe damage, loss of life, and tsunamis. The strongest earthquakes to strike Paphos occurred in 76 AD, 1222 (7.0–7.5), 1953 (6.5 M_{s}), 1995 (5.9 M_{w}), 1996 (6.8 M_{w}) and 2022 (6.6 M_{w}).

== History ==
=== Foundation myth ===
In its foundation myth, the town's name is linked to the goddess Aphrodite, as the eponymous Paphos was the son (or, in Ovid's account, the daughter) of Pygmalion whose ivory cult image of Aphrodite was brought to life by the goddess, as 'milk-white' Galatea.

The Bibliotheke contains a genealogy. Pygmalion was so devoted to the cult of Aphrodite that he took the statue to his palace and kept it on his couch. The daimon of the goddess entered the statue, and the living Galatea bore Pygmalion a son, Paphos, and a daughter, Metharme. Cinyras –either the son of Paphos or the suitor of Metharme– founded the city under Aphrodite's patronage and built the great temple to the goddess there. According to another legend preserved by Strabo (xi. p. 505), it was founded by Agapenor, a hero of the Trojan War. According to Pausanias, a storm drove Agapenor and the Arcadian fleet to Cyprus, where he founded Paphos and established the sanctuary of Aphrodite at Palaepaphos.

=== Old Paphos ===
Old Paphos (Palaepaphos) in the modern city Kouklia is on a hill to the east of the modern city. It had a road which spanned a few miles to the sea. Ancient historians described it as near the Zephyrium promontory and the mouth of the Bocarus stream.

Archaeology shows that Palaepaphos has been inhabited since the Neolithic period. It was a centre for Aphrodite's cult. Aphrodite's mythical birthplace was on the island. The founding myth is interwoven with the goddess such that Old Paphos became the most important place for worshipping Aphrodite in the ancient world.

The Greek names of two ancient kings, Etevandros and Akestor, are attested in Cypriot syllabary on objects from the 7th century BC found in Kourion.

=== Aphrodite and Paphos ===
The Greeks agreed that Aphrodite had landed at the site of Paphos when she rose from the sea. According to Pausanias (i. 14), although her worship was introduced to Paphos from Syria, it was more likely that it was of Phoenician origin. Before being proven by archaeology it was thought that Aphrodite's cult had been established before the time of Homer (c. 700 BC), as the grove and altar of Aphrodite at Paphos are mentioned in the Odyssey (viii. 362). Archaeology established that Cypriots venerated a fertility goddess in a cult that combined Aegean and eastern mainland aspects before the arrival of the mainland Greeks. Female figurines and charms found in the immediate vicinity date back to the early third millennium. The temenos was well established before the first structures were erected in the Late Bronze Age:

There was unbroken continuity of cult from that time until 391 AD when the Roman Emperor Theodosius I outlawed all pagan religions and the sanctuary fell into the ruins in which we find it today.

— Ashmolean Museum

Old Paphos was the centre of worship for Aphrodite in the Aegean world. The Cinyradae, or descendants of Cinyras, were the chief priests; Greek by name but of Phoenician origin. Their power and authority were great, but it has been inferred from certain inscriptions that they were controlled by a senate and an assembly of the people. There was also an oracle there. The ruins of Aphrodite's vast sanctuary are still discernible, its circumference marked by huge foundation walls. After its destruction by an earthquake it was rebuilt by Vespasian, on whose coins it is represented, as well as on earlier and later ones, and in the style on those of Septimius Severus. From these representations and existing ruins, Gustav Friedrich Hetsch, an architect of Copenhagen, attempted to restore the building.

=== Nea Paphos ===
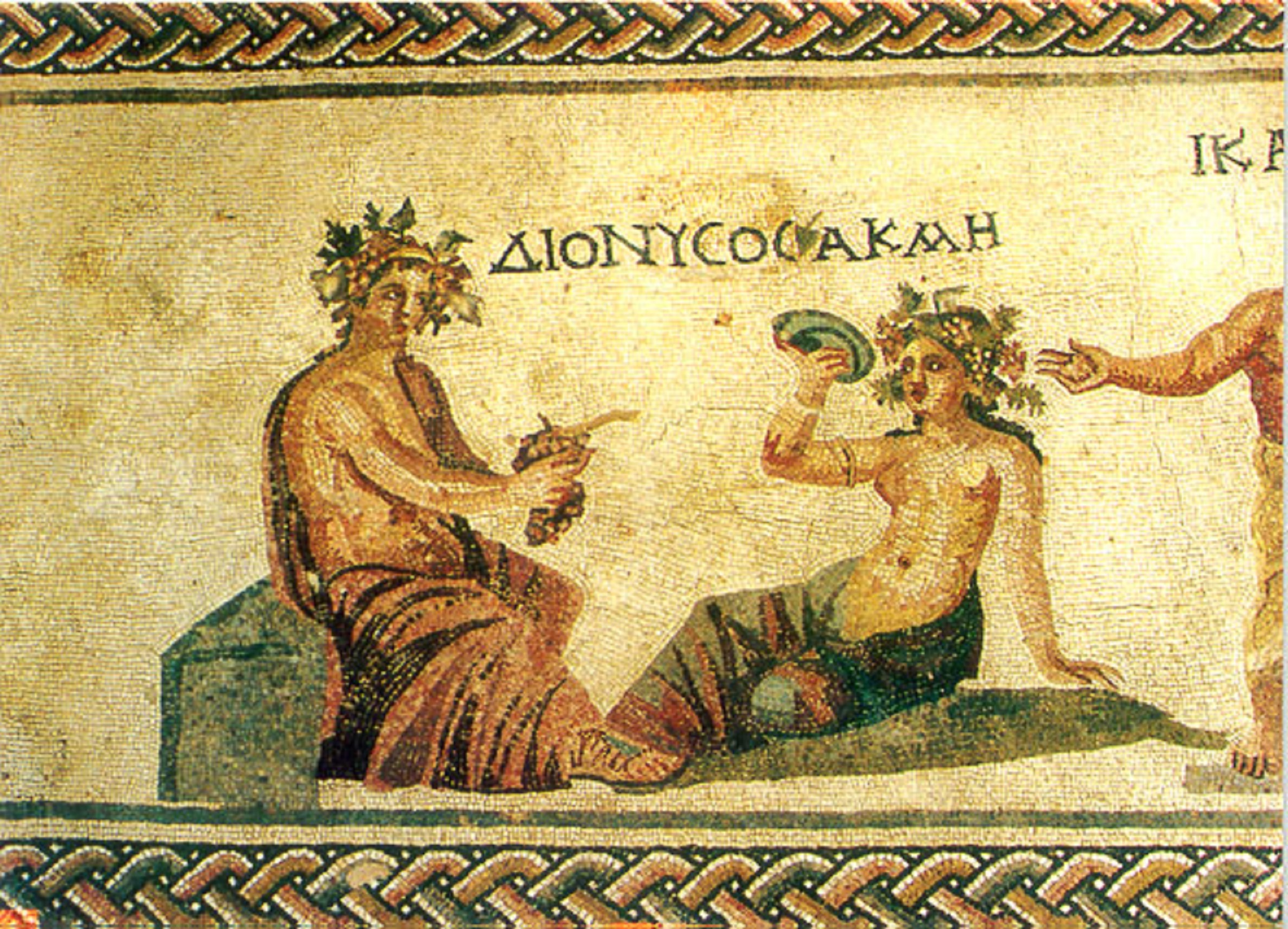
Mosaic from the House of Dionysos, god of wine, 3rd c. AD

Nea Paphos ("New Paphos") was founded on the sea near a natural harbour. It lay about 60 stadia or 12 km (7.5 mi) northwest of the old city. According to its own origin myth, Nea Paphos was founded by Agapenor, chief of the Arcadians at the siege of Troy, who, after the capture of the city, was driven to the coast of Cyprus by the storm that separated the Greek fleet as it returned home. (Pausanias viii. 5. § 2.) An Agapenor was mentioned as king of the Paphians in a Greek distich preserved in the Analecta; and Herodotus (vii. 90) alludes to an Arcadian colony in Cyprus.

Nea Paphos was likely founded by Nicocles (d. 306 BC), the last king of Palaepaphos, based on an inscription in the temple of Artemis Agrotera at New Paphos and other historical evidence. The inhabitants of Marion were probably also transferred to this new city after it was destroyed by Ptolemy in 312 BC. A hoard of unused silver coins (in the Cyprus Museum) dating back to the end of the 4th century BC are the earliest find at the site.

Old Paphos always retained its pre-eminence in worship of Aphrodite, and Strabo states that the road leading to it from New Paphos was annually crowded with male and female devotees travelling to the ancient shrine, coming from New Paphos and other towns. When Seneca said (N. Q. vi. 26, Epistle 91) that Paphos was nearly destroyed by an earthquake, it is difficult to say to which of the towns he refers. Cassius Dio (liv. 23) relates that Paphos was restored by Augustus and re-named "Augusta" in his honor; this name has been preserved in inscriptions but never supplanted the original name.

An inscription from the 80s BC speaks of a certain Onesander of Paphos being appointed to the Great Library of Alexandria.

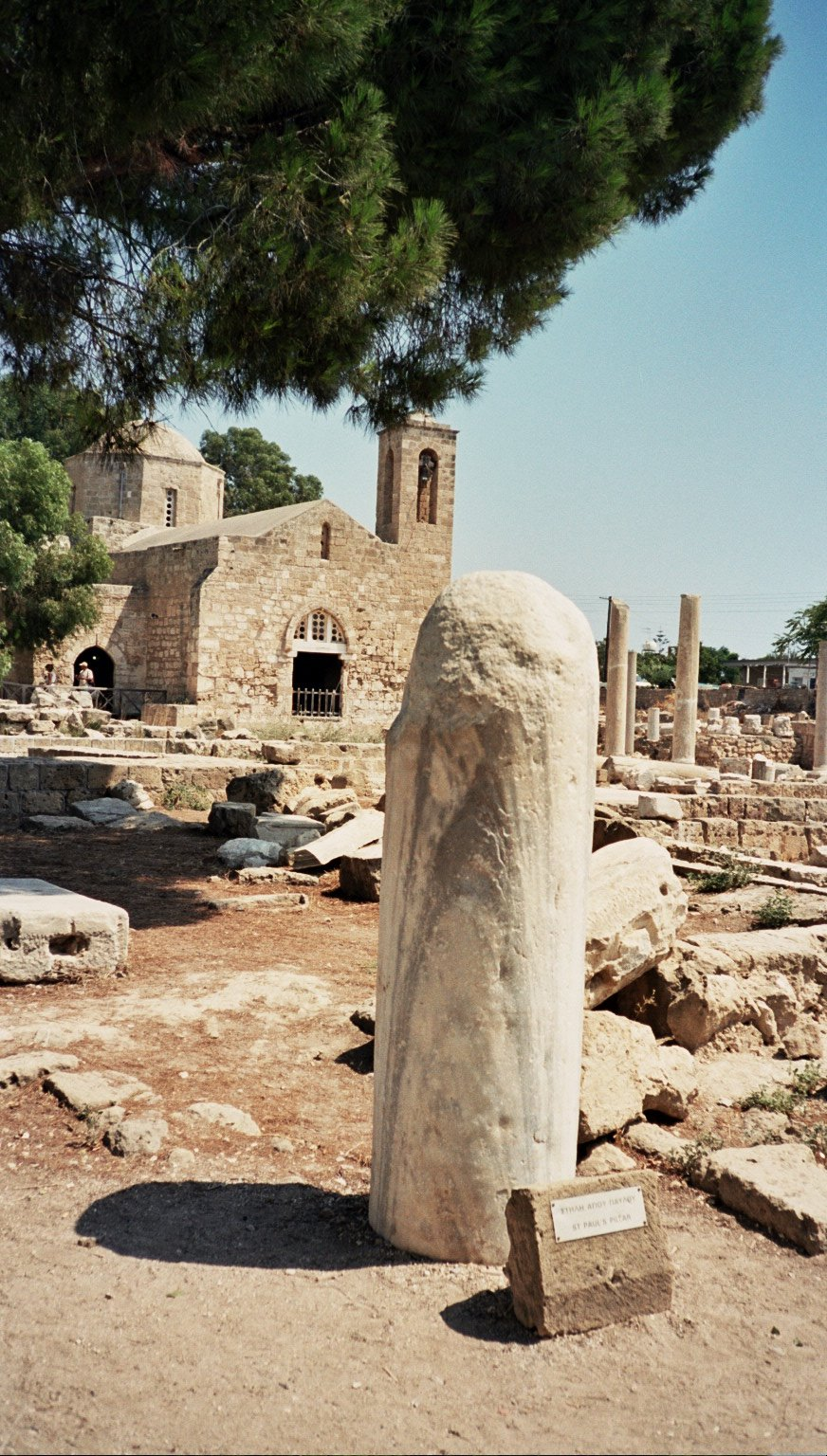
St Paul's Pillar in Paphos

According to the biblical Acts of the Apostles, after landing at Salamis and proclaiming the Word of God in the synagogues, the prophets and teachers, Barnabas and Saul of Tarsus, traveled along the entire southern coast of Cyprus until they reached Paphos. There, Sergius Paulus, the Roman proconsul, was converted after Saul rebuked the sorcerer Elymas. In Paphos, Acts first identifies Saul as Paul.

Tacitus (Hist. ii. 2, 3) records a visit of the youthful Titus to Paphos before he acceded to the empire, who inquired with much curiosity into its history and antiquities. (Cf. Suetonius Titus c. 5.) Under this name, the historian included the ancient as well as the more modern city, and among other traits of the worship of the temple he records that the only image of the goddess was a pyramidal stone.

The sanctuary was closed during the persecution of pagans in the late Roman Empire.

=== Archaeology ===
The ancient city of Nea Paphos is a UNESCO World Heritage site. It is managed as the Paphos Archaeological Park by the Cyprus Department of Antiquities.

Remains discovered at Nea Paphos include four large and elaborate Roman villas dubbed the House of Dionysos, the House of Orpheus, the House of Aion, and the House of Theseus, all with preserved mosaic floors. In addition, excavations have uncovered an agora, Asklepion, the Basilica of Panagia Limeniotissa, a theatre, and a necropolis known as the Tombs of the Kings.

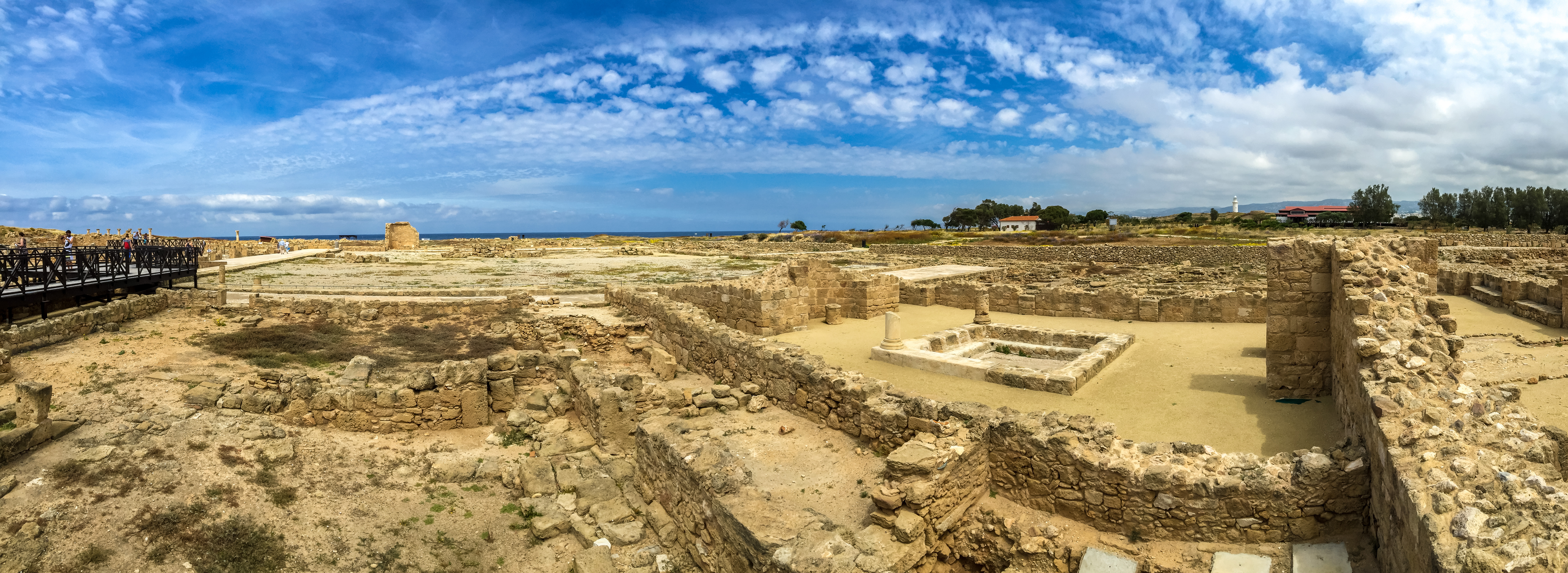
Ruins of Nea Paphos, Paphos Archaeological Park
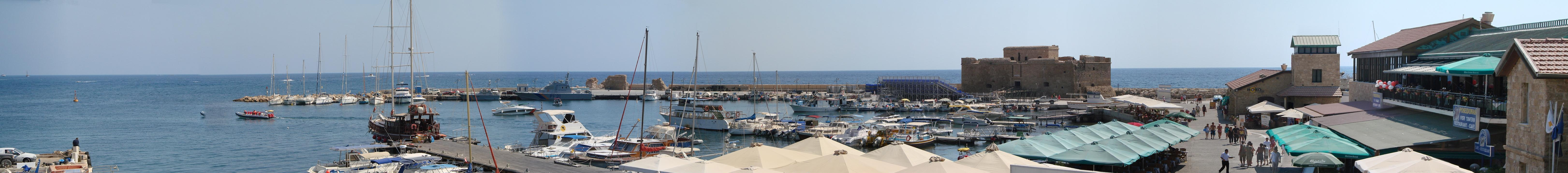
Panoramic view of the port and the medieval castle.

=== Post-Classical history ===
Paphos gradually lost much of its attraction as an administrative centre, particularly after the founding of Nicosia. The city and its port continued to decline throughout the Middle Ages and Ottoman rule, as Nicosia, and the port city of Larnaca became more important.

The city and district continued to lose population throughout the British colonial period and many of its inhabitants moved to Limassol, Nicosia and overseas. The city and district of Paphos remained the most underdeveloped part of the island until 1974.

=== Modern Paphos ===
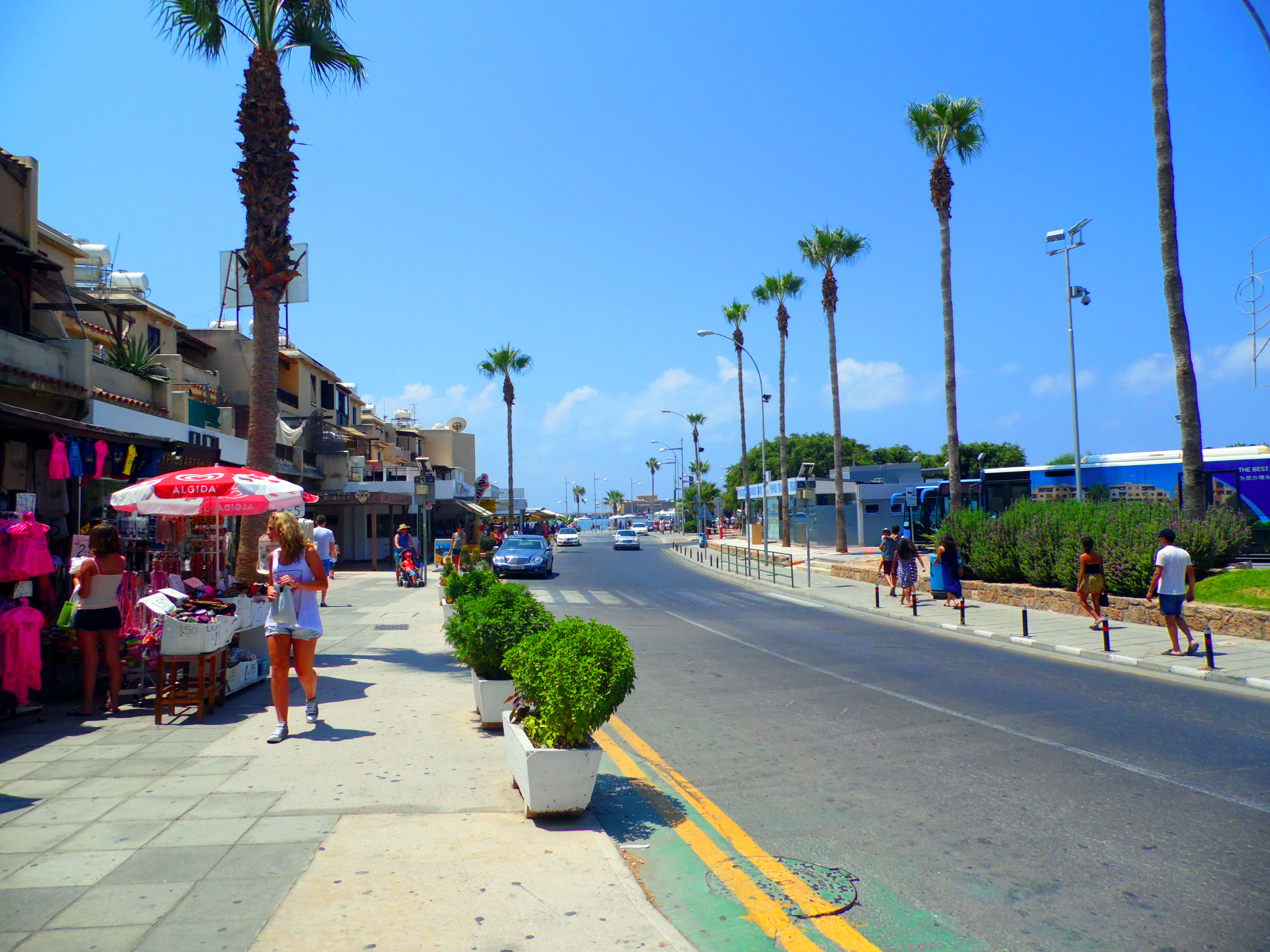
Kato Paphos, Apostolou Pavlou Ave that leading to the Paphos Coastline, on the right — the bus station

Following the Turkish invasion of Cyprus in 1974, there was rapid economic activity in all fields, especially tourism in the Kato Paphos area. The government invested heavily in irrigation dams and water distribution works, road infrastructure and the building of Paphos International Airport, the second international airport in Cyprus.

In the 1980s, Kato Paphos received most of the investment. In the 1990s, Coral Bay Resort was further developed and in the 2000s, the Aphrodite Hills resort was developed.

Today Paphos, with a population of about 35,961 (as of 2018), is a popular tourist resort and is home to a fishing harbour. Ktima is the main residential district while Kato Paphos, by the sea, is built around the medieval port and contains most of the luxury hotels and the entertainment infrastructure of the city. Apostolou Pavlou Avenue (St. Paul's Avenue), the busiest road in Paphos, connects two quarters of the city. It begins near the city centre at Kennedy Square and ends outside the medieval fort at the harbour.

== Economy ==
The economy of Paphos is heavily dependent on tourism. There are four resorts in the district: Kato Paphos, Coral Bay, Latchi, and Aphrodite Hills. Kato Paphos, the largest, employs over half of Paphos's population. Farming, especially banana, grape and tobacco cultivation, contributes significantly to Paphos's economy.

== Landmarks ==
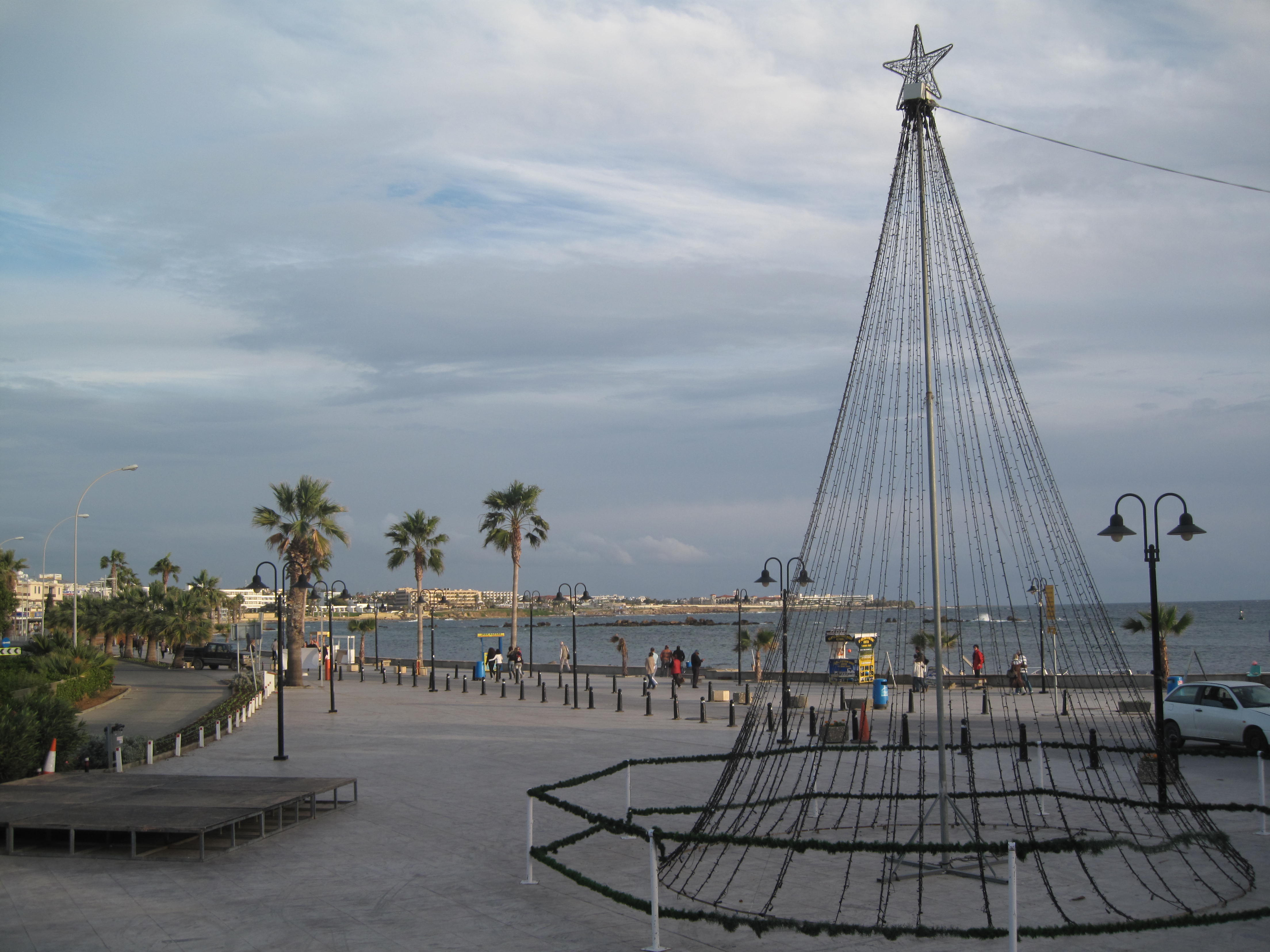
Paphos pedestrian boulevard

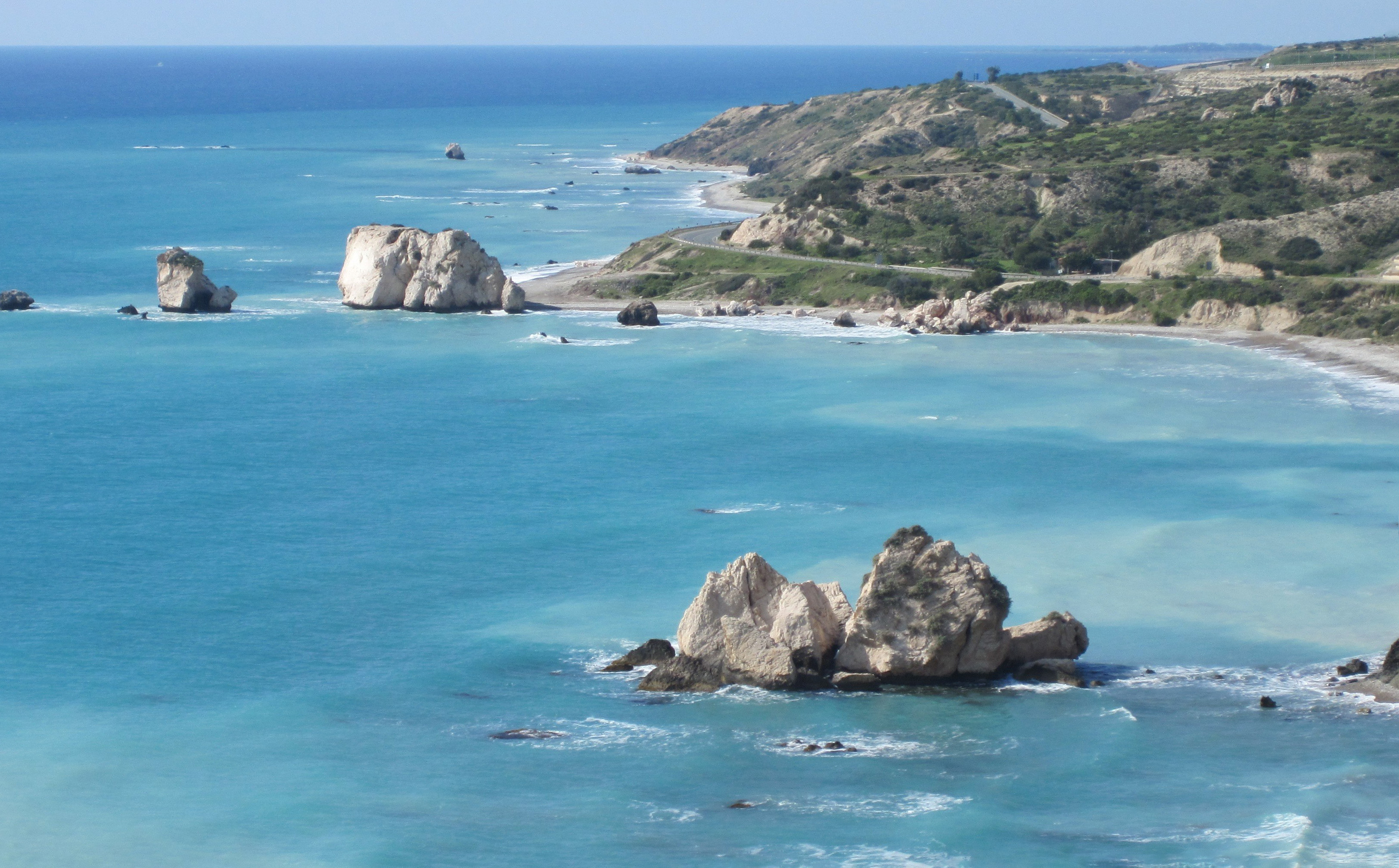
The "Saracen Rock" (foreground) and "Aphrodite's Rock" (Petra tou Romiou) (background)

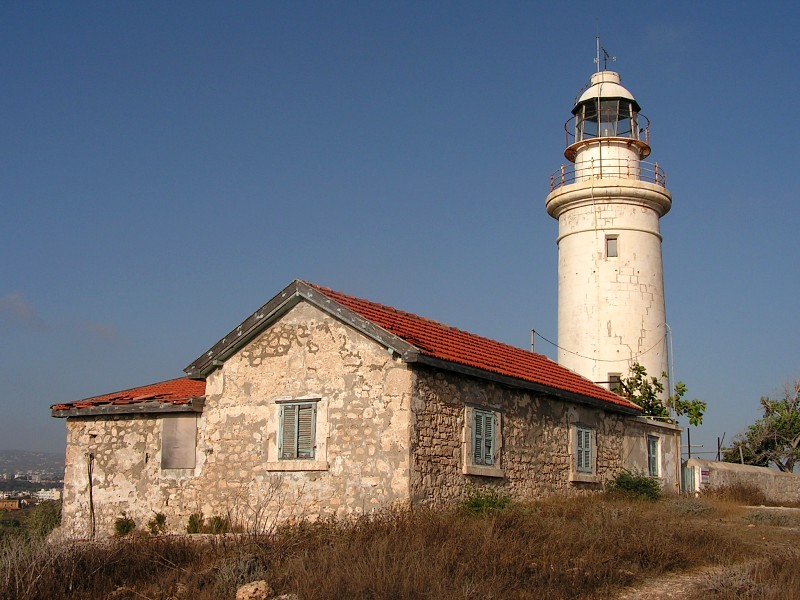
Paphos Lighthouse

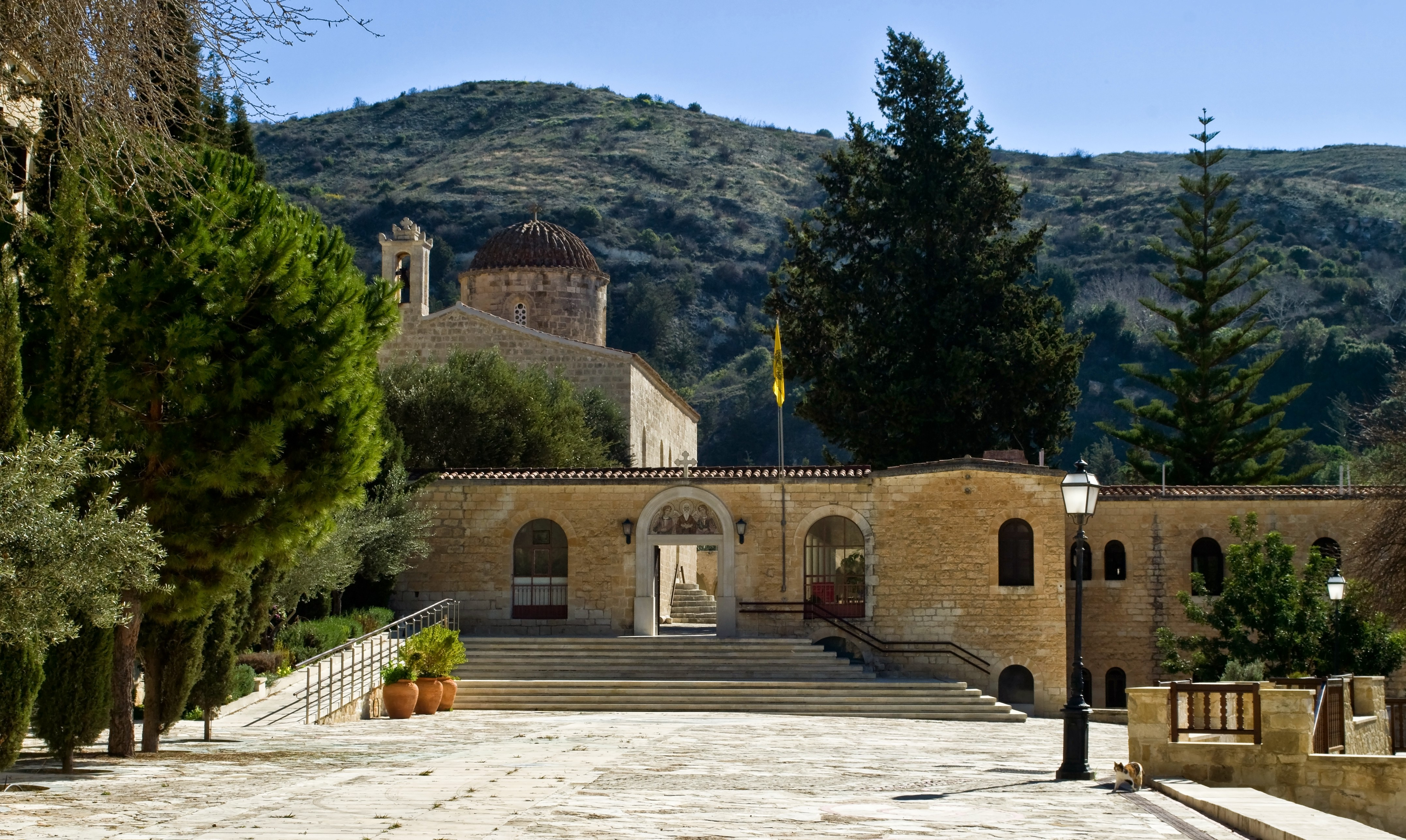
Agios Neophytos Monastery

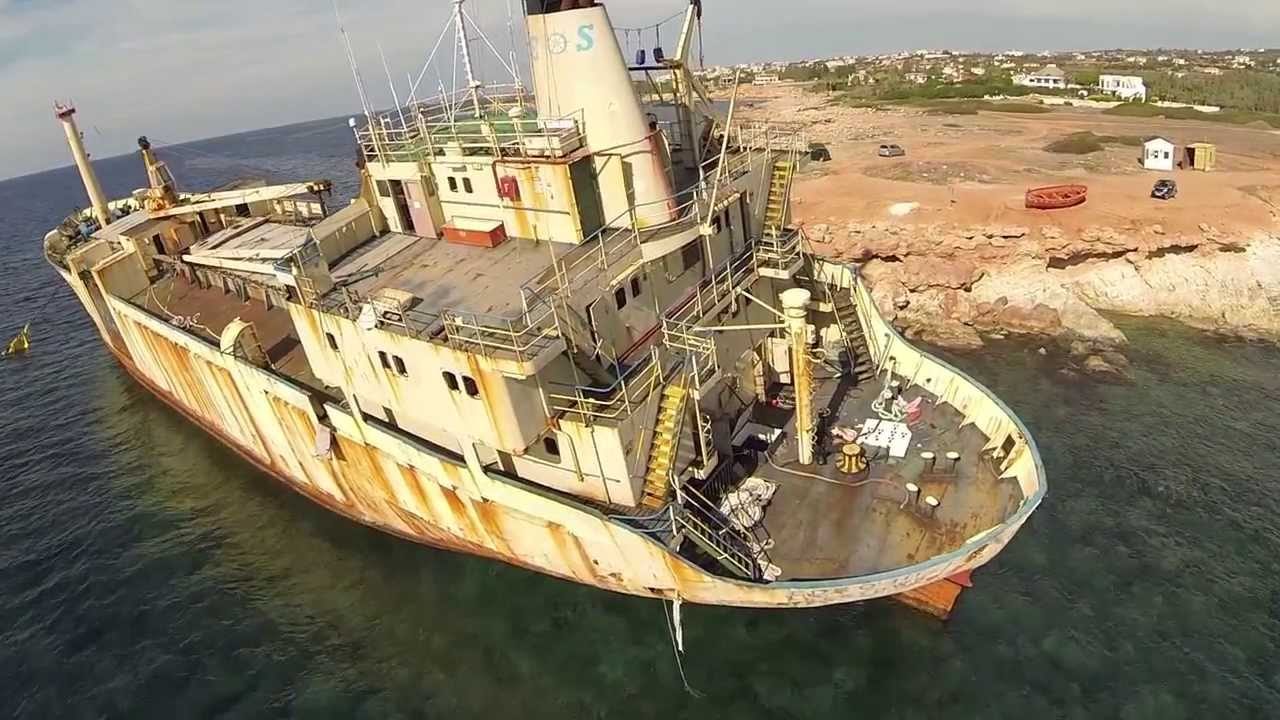
M/V EDRO III resting off the rocks near the Sea Caves northwest of Paphos

Paphos Castle stands by the harbor, and was originally a Byzantine fort built to protect the harbour. It was rebuilt by the Lusignans in the 13th century before being dismantled in 1570 by the Venetians, who were unable to defend it against the Ottomans who restored and strengthened it after capturing the island. Saranta Kolones, near the harbor, is a castle built in the first years of Lusignan rule (beginning of the 12th century) maybe on the site of a previous Byzantine castle. It was destroyed in the earthquake of 1222.

Among the treasures unearthed near Paphos are the mosaics in the Houses of Dionysos, Theseus and Aion, preserved after 16 centuries underground; vaults and caves; the Tombs of the Kings; and the pillar to which Saint Paul was said to have been tied and whipped and the ancient Odeon Theatre. Other places of interest include the Byzantine Museum and the District Archaeological Museum, with its collection of Cypriot antiquities from the Paphos area dating back from the Neolithic Age up to 1700 AD. Near the Odeon are the ruins of the ancient city walls, the Roman agora, and a building dedicated to Asclepius.

The mosaic floors of these elite villas dating from the 3rd to the 5th century are among the finest in the Eastern Mediterranean. They mainly depict scenes from Greek mythology.

The city contains many catacomb sites dating back to the early Christian period. The most famous is Saint Solomoni Church, originally a Christian catacomb retaining some of its 12th century frescoes. A sacred tree at the entrance is believed to cure the ailments of those who hang a personal offering on its branches.

A few kilometres outside the city in Palaepaphos, near modern Kouklia, is the rock Petra tou Romiou, which sits in the sea. According to legend, Aphrodite rose from the waves at this spot. The name is associated with the legendary frontier-guard of Byzantine times, Digenis Acritas, who kept the marauding Saracens at bay. It is said that to repel one attack he heaved a large rock at his enemy.

Near Petra tou Romiou is Palaepaphos, founded in the 17th century BC and the seat of the ancient city-state of Paphos. The ruins of the Sanctuary of Aphrodite Paphia stand here, dating back as early as the 12th century BC. The temple was one of the most important places of Aphrodite's cult and pilgrimage of the ancient world until the 3rd–4th centuries AD. The museum, housed in the Lusignan Manor, houses artifacts from the area.

Geroskipou is a town in Paphos's metropolitan area known for its delight 'loukoumi'.

North-east of Paphos lies Agios Neophytos Monastery, known for its "encleistra" (enclosure) carved out of the mountain by the hermit himself, which features some Byzantine frescoes from the 12th and 15th centuries. The painted village church of Emba (Empa) is nearby.

Four kilometres (2.5 mi) north of Paphos is the village of Lemba (Lempa), home to numerous artists, many of whom have open studio shops. It is home to the sculpture known as the Great Wall of Lempa by the Cypriot artist Stass Paraskos and the Cyprus College of Art.

Off the coast of Paphos is the wreck of M/V Demetrios II which ran aground on 23 March 1998 in heavy seas during a voyage from Greece to Syria with a cargo of timber.

Similarly, on 8 December 2011, the EDRO III ran aground off the coast of Cyprus. It is located near the Sea Caves of Paphos on the western shore of the island close to the Akamas Peninsula. Local authorities are hesitant to remove the ship from the rocks due to the fact that the coastline is a protected natural park where turtles nest and endemic plant and animal species thrive.

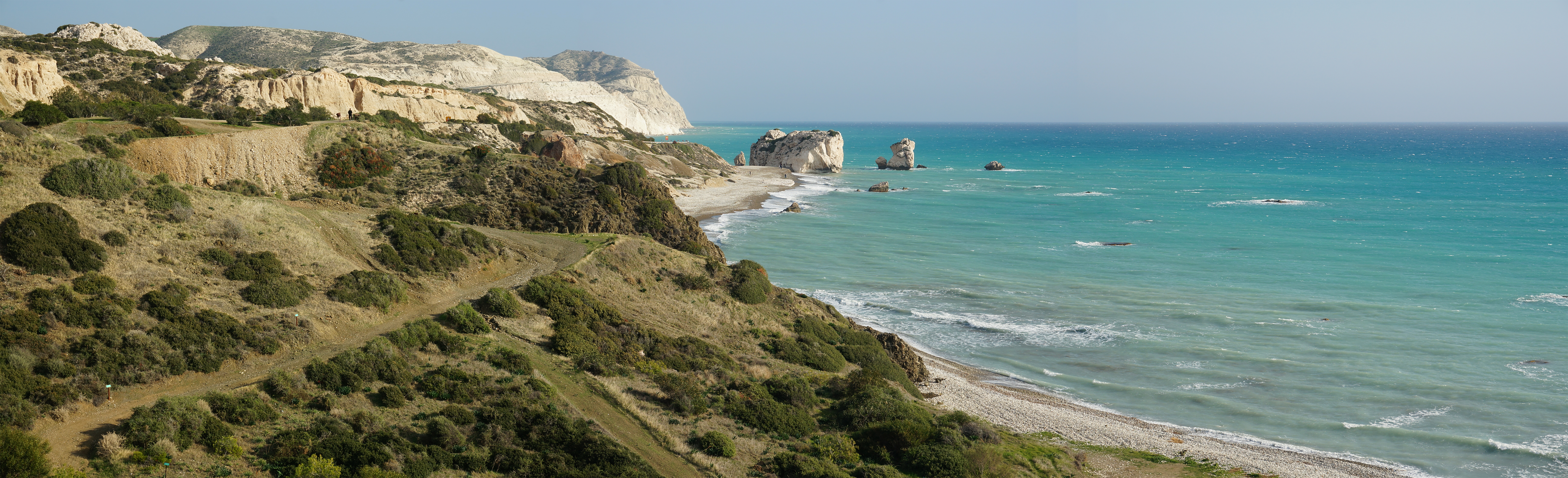
"Aphrodite's Rock" (Petra tou Romiou) on the coast of Kouklia near Paphos.

== Climate ==
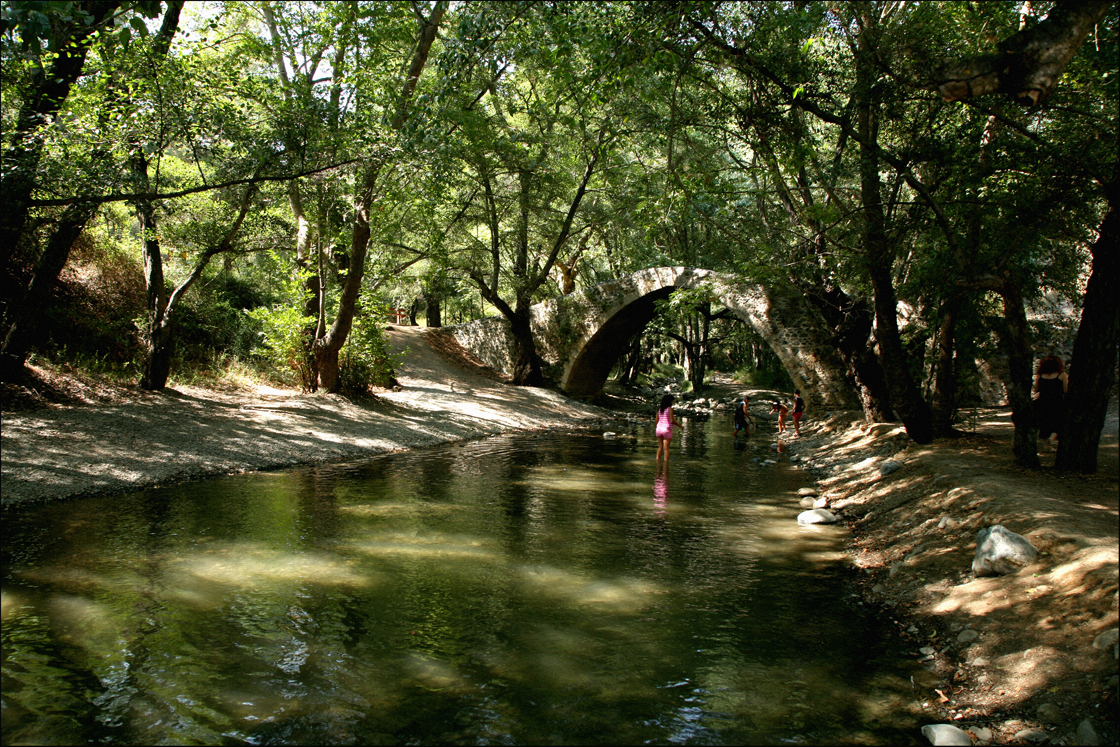
Tzielefos bridge over the Diarizos River, Paphos forest

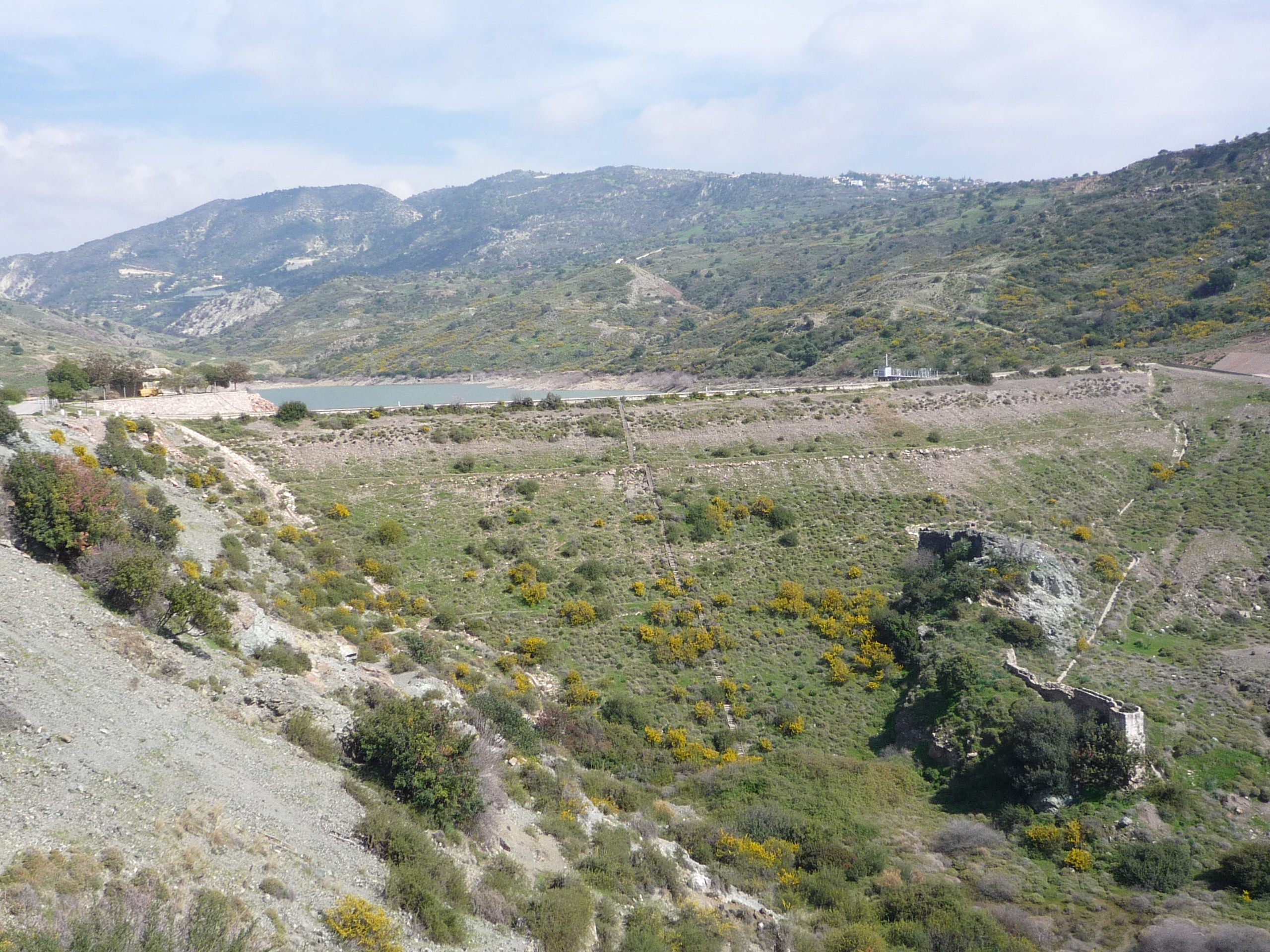
Mavrokolympos Dam

Paphos has a hot semi-arid climate (Köppen: BSh), closely bordering a hot-summer Mediterranean climate (Köppen: Csa), with hot, dry summers and mild, wet winters. The greatest amounts of rain occur from November to mid-March, while it almost never rains in the summer, with an average of less than 0.3 millimetres or 0.012 inches in July and August. In these rainless months, however, humidity measurements can go up to 85 percent.

Snowfall occurs rarely – approximately every 10 years – and does not normally lead to any significant disruption. It occurs almost annually in the hills of Tsada, 6 km (4 miles) north. The last significant snowfall in the city centre occurred in the winter of 2001.

Frost is also very rare.

Heatwaves in July and August are relatively common, when hot air masses from the Sahara desert drift over to Cyprus causing temperatures to rise. Cyprus has experienced drought-like conditions and the current trend of global warming may increase the severity of these conditions. In the summer of 2008, Cyprus had to ship water by tanker from Greece to meet demand on the island. Since then, water conditions have eased due to good winter rains.

Climate data for Paphos (Paphos International Airport) (1991–2020)
Month	Jan	Feb	Mar	Apr	May	Jun	Jul	Aug	Sep	Oct	Nov	Dec	Year
Record high °C (°F)	24.0 (75.2)	26.6 (79.9)	30.8 (87.4)	34.2 (93.6)	42.5 (108.5)	38.4 (101.1)	41.6 (106.9)	36.6 (97.9)	36.2 (97.2)	35.6 (96.1)	31.6 (88.9)	26.5 (79.7)	42.5 (108.5)
Mean daily maximum °C (°F)	17.3 (63.1)	17.6 (63.7)	19.2 (66.6)	21.8 (71.2)	24.9 (76.8)	28.1 (82.6)	30.4 (86.7)	31.0 (87.8)	29.4 (84.9)	27.0 (80.6)	23.1 (73.6)	19.3 (66.7)	24.1 (75.4)
Daily mean °C (°F)	13.0 (55.4)	13.1 (55.6)	14.4 (57.9)	16.8 (62.2)	20.0 (68.0)	23.3 (73.9)	25.7 (78.3)	26.4 (79.5)	24.6 (76.3)	22.1 (71.8)	18.3 (64.9)	14.9 (58.8)	19.4 (66.9)
Mean daily minimum °C (°F)	8.6 (47.5)	8.5 (47.3)	9.6 (49.3)	11.9 (53.4)	15.2 (59.4)	18.5 (65.3)	21.0 (69.8)	21.7 (71.1)	19.8 (67.6)	17.2 (63.0)	13.4 (56.1)	10.4 (50.7)	14.7 (58.5)
Record low °C (°F)	−1.5 (29.3)	−3.6 (25.5)	0.8 (33.4)	1.6 (34.9)	8.5 (47.3)	10.5 (50.9)	15.0 (59.0)	17.0 (62.6)	12.6 (54.7)	9.6 (49.3)	2.8 (37.0)	−1.3 (29.7)	−3.6 (25.5)
Average precipitation mm (inches)	89.5 (3.52)	60.1 (2.37)	34.5 (1.36)	15.2 (0.60)	11.1 (0.44)	1.6 (0.06)	0.2 (0.01)	0.1 (0.00)	4.2 (0.17)	21.7 (0.85)	57.5 (2.26)	97.6 (3.84)	393.3 (15.48)
Average relative humidity (%)	70	69	70	70	72	73	74	74	69	66	65	69	70
Mean monthly sunshine hours	180.1	191.2	245.5	277.9	336.6	371.8	381.6	355.0	312.3	278.3	219.7	181.0	3,331
Source: NOAA

== Transport ==
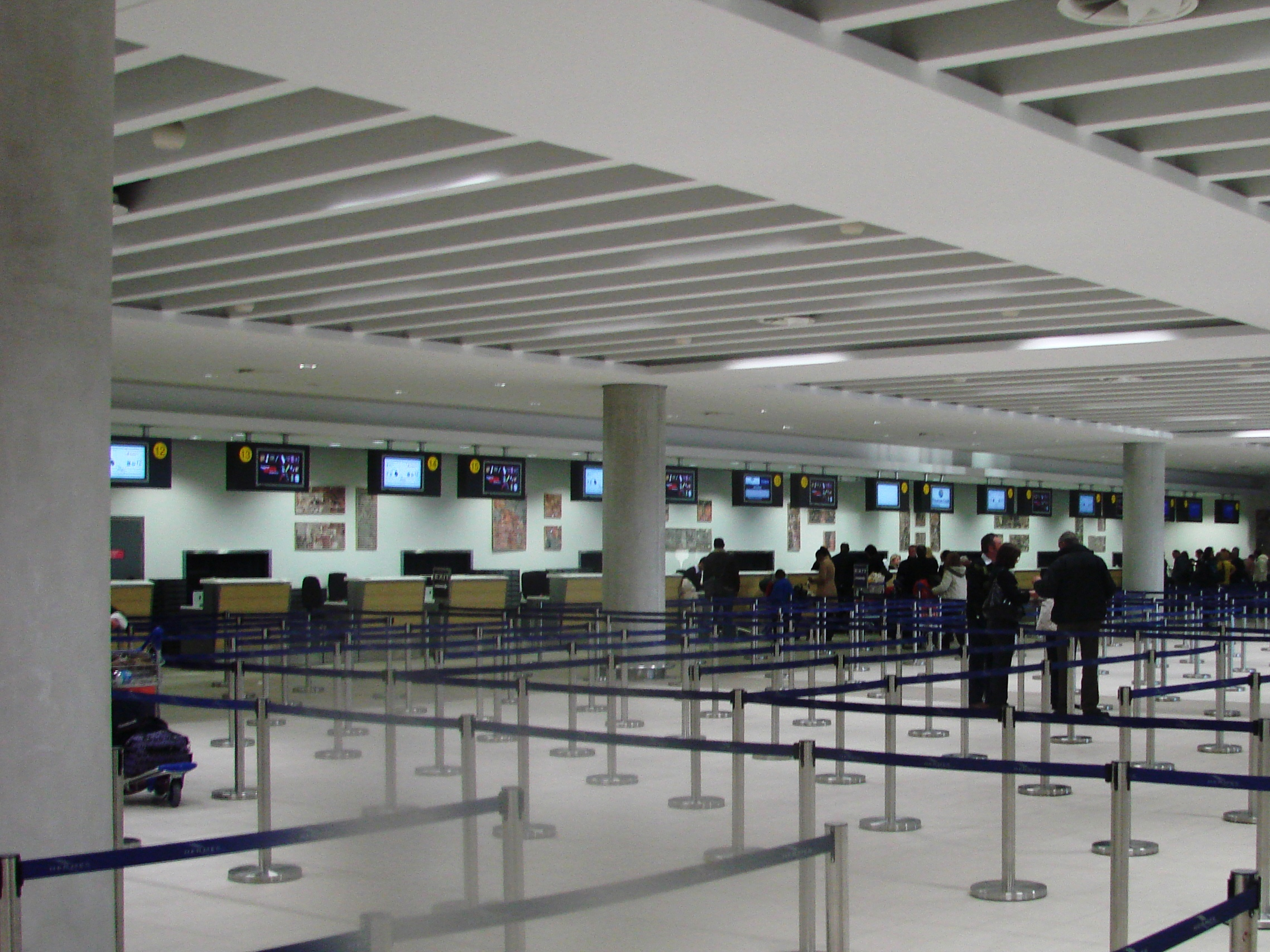
Paphos International Airport check-in desks

Paphos was once the only traffic-free town in Cyprus; things changed after the urbanization and rise of the population in less than ten years. The roads in the town centre remain unchanged and are unable to accommodate the new level of traffic. The problems exist because some planned road links remain on paper, including:

- 2nd part of the northern ring road
- Western ring road
- Airport road
- Paphos – Coral Bay road upgrade

=== Public transport ===
Buses in Paphos are operated by Osypa.

For intercity transportation the main operator is Intercity Buses which offers daily connections across all cities in the southern part of Cyprus.

The main bus station is Karavella station. It is the nexus for all intercity routes and many of the local routes. The other major bus station in Paphos is the Kato Paphos Harbor station, located close to Paphos Harbor and the Paphos Archaeological Park.

=== Motorways ===
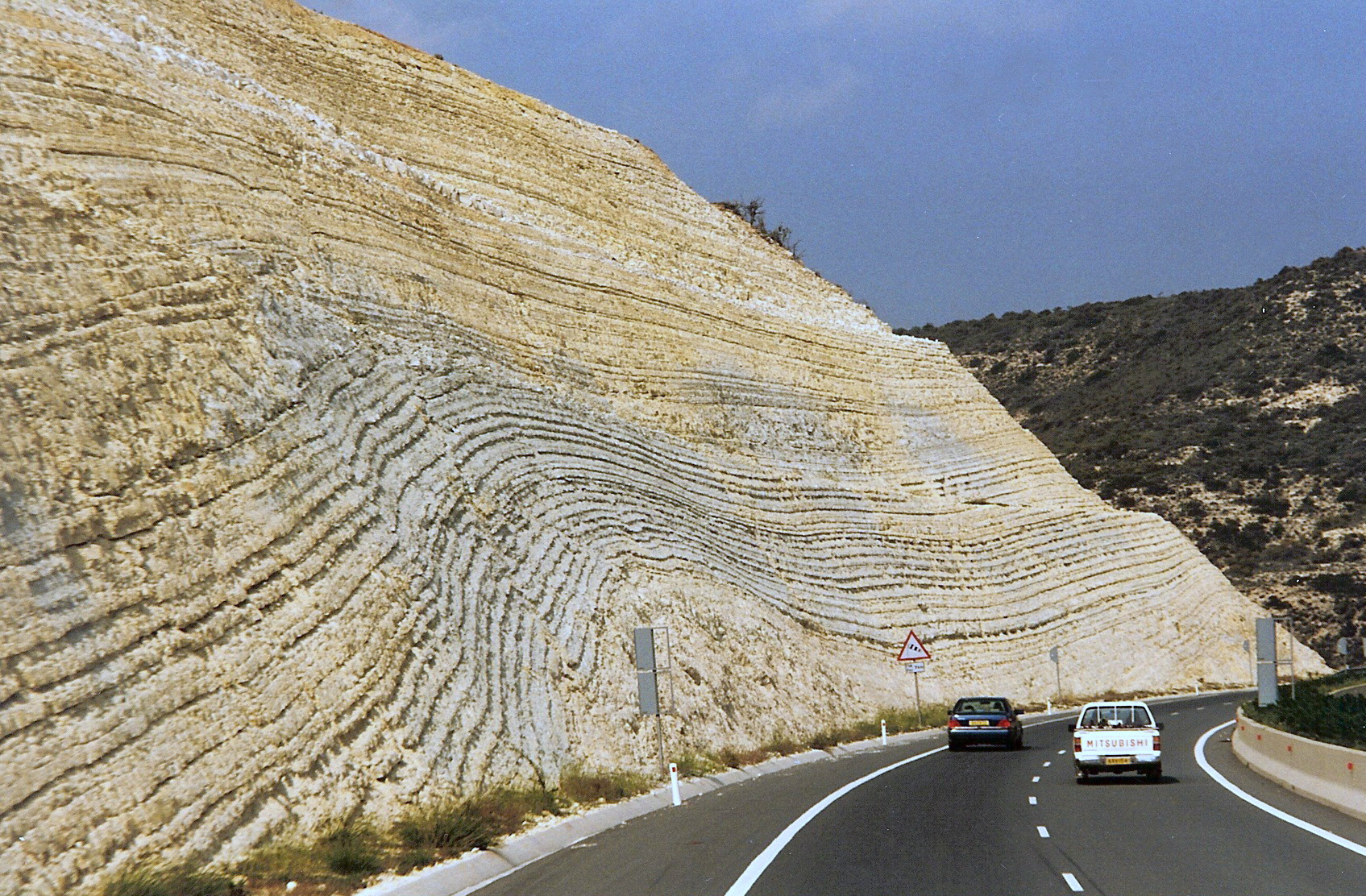
Chalk layers in A6 motorway (Cyprus)

Paphos did not have a motorway link until 2001. It is now accessed through the A6 which connects Paphos with Limassol. The A7 motorway from Paphos to Polis was to have been completed by 2013, though work has not started yet due to the financial crisis in Cyprus. The works are undergoing as of August 2023.

=== Airport ===
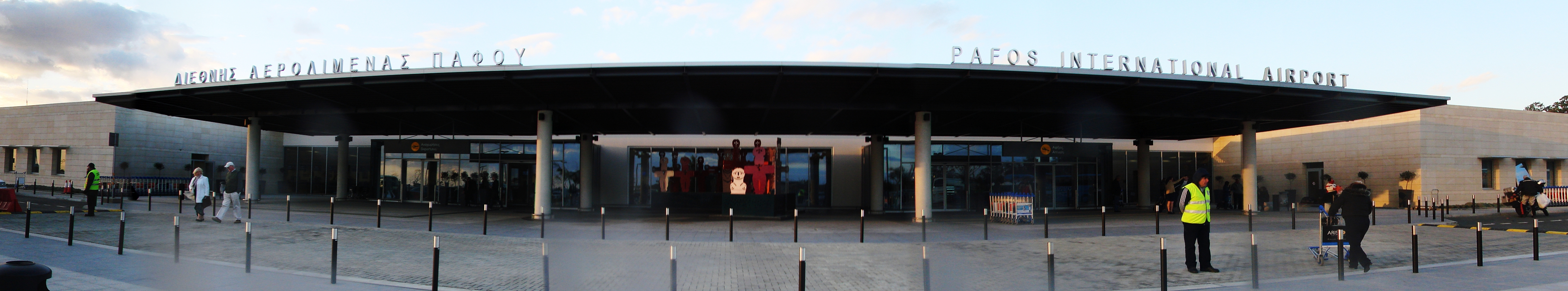
Paphos International Airport exterior

Since 1982, air traffic of Paphos is served by Paphos International Airport located 10 km (6 mi) southeast of the city, near Timi. It serves approximately 1.75 million people every year. A new terminal opened in late 2008 adjacent to the old one.

=== Port ===
The port is able to hold 300 boats and serves as a small marina and a fisherman shelter. The castle's square hosts Aphrodite's festival every September since 1998. Several other yearly events are hosted in the square, including the Paphos beer festival. Cargo and cruise ships use the Limassol Port 60 km (37 mi) away. A marina is planned to be constructed 10 km (6 mi) north, next to Coral Bay in Kissonerga. The new marina will serve up to 1,000 boats.

== Hospitals and medical centres ==
Paphos has only one general hospital located at Anavargos, 3 km (2 mi) northeast of the city centre. It was built to replace the old hospital, which was demolished shortly after being abandoned; now, it is a modern medical centre. There was consideration that it might be turned into a university hospital when Neapolis University was opened; as of July 2017, this has not transpired.

There are two hospices in the area: The Friends Hospice and the Archangel Michael Hospice, which is funded by the Catholic Church in Cyprus.

There are also several private clinics spread throughout the area, such as St George's Private Hospital, built in 1991.

== Education ==
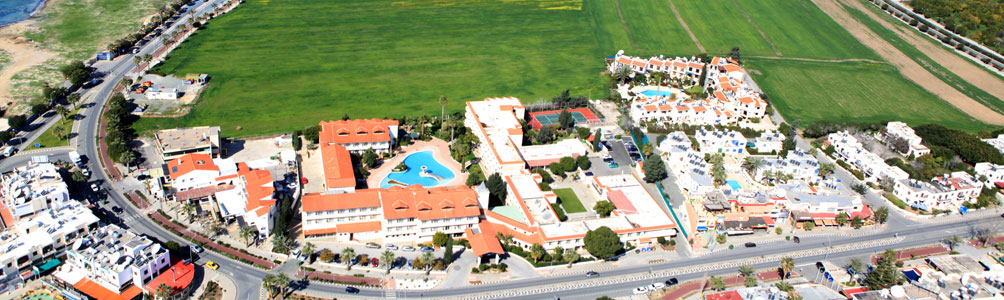
Neapolis University

The Paphos municipality has 38 primary state schools, 8 secondary state schools (known as gymnasiums and lyceums), 3 privately run English schools and one privately run Russian school. First elementary school in Paphos was founded in 1796, in village Kritou Terra.

=== Higher education ===
The town of Paphos has several higher education institutes. The first one, Neapolis University began accepting students in June 2010. The university offers a wide range of undergraduate and postgraduate programmes and consists of 4 schools. Recently the American University of Beirut and the Cyprus University of Technology (TEPAK), were built.

== Arts ==
Paphos is known for its cultural and historical interests, including the Tombs of the Kings, Mosaics, castle and numerous churches, though it is also popular for its festivals and annual events.

During September, Paphos holds an annual opera at the Paphos' Aphrodite Festival at the harbor. The castle serves as a backdrop and stage for the performance. Another annual event is Open Studios Cyprus which takes place during selected weekends in October. Selected artists open their studio doors to the general public and provide an informal environment to view and discuss the work with the artist.

There are a number of privately owned galleries and exhibition spaces. Details and dates for the regular events can be found in the local English newspapers, such as Cyprus Weekly and Cyprus Monthly. Palia Ilektriki is an exhibition and conference space maintained by the Paphos Municipality. In the centre of the town, this converted plays host to both conferences and exhibitions throughout the year. In 2009, 2010, and 2011, Open Studios Cyprus used this location to launch the event with an Opening Art Exhibition.

In 2012, Paphos won the title as European Capital of Culture 2017, under the Executive Direction of Ektor Tsatsoulis and the Artistic Director Spyros Pisinos. In 2013, Marios Joannou Elia became the artistic director of "Pafos 2017". Following the financial crisis on the island in 2013, Elia redesigned and recalculated the entire programme.

== Sports ==
Paphos has a long history in sports with several football, basketball, volleyball teams, including Pafos FC. The Pafian gymnastic club is called Korivos, and it owns (via the Cyprus Athletic Organisation) the local Aphroditi Sports hall and the Stelios Kyriakides Stadium, named after Stylianos Kyriakides (Greek: Στυλιανός Κυριακίδης; 1910–1987), a marathon runner from the nearby village Statos, who won the 1946 Boston Marathon. According to a newspaper report, he was running with John Kelley near the end, when an old man shouted from the crowd, "For Greece, for your children!", inspiring him to pull away and win the race.

Paphos was home to Turkish Cypriot sport team Baf Ülkü Yurdu. After the intercommunal conflict and Turkish invasion Baf Ülkü Yurdu relocated to Morphou.

== Notable people ==
- Kypros Nicolaides, British Cypriot neognologist
- Sopater of Paphos (Σώπατρος), a writer of parody and burlesque
- Evagoras Pallikarides, EOKA fighter, hanged by the British at 19
- Archbishop Makarios, first President of the Republic of Cyprus
- Rauf Denktaş, Turkish-Cypriot politician
- Marios Joannou Elia, composer and artistic director
- Suat Günsel, billionaire businessman
- Sonay Adem, socialist politician
- Giorgos Lillikas, candidate for Cyprus Presidential elections
- Stavros Malas, Minister of Health, candidate for Cyprus Presidential elections
- Alex Christofi, Arjatos lokajis
- Özker Özgür, pro-unification Turkish-Cypriot politician
- Theo Paphitis, British-Cypriot businessman
- Michalis Polynikis, politician
- Andrew Theophanous, politician
- Christos Shelis, footballer
- Paul Stenning, author, lives in Paphos
- Alan Knott, ex-cricketer, moved here in the early 2000s

== International relations ==
=== Twin towns – sister cities ===
Paphos is twinned with:

- Alexandria, Egypt
- Amman, Jordan
- Anzio, Italy
- Chania, Greece (since 1995)
- Corfu, Greece (since 1995)
- Herzliya, Israel
- Kalamaria, Greece (since 1995)
- Lamia, Greece (since 1995)
- Mytilene, Greece (since 1995)
- Preveza, Greece (since 1995)

=== Consulates ===
As of October 2024, Paphos hosts 3 consulates.

- France
- Russia
- Ukraine

== See also ==
- Akamas
- Aphrodite
- International School of Paphos
- Kouklia
- Nea Paphos
- Palaepaphos
- Paphos Archaeological Museum
- Polis
- Tombs of the Kings

== Bibliography ==
- National Geophysical Data Center. "Global Significant Earthquake Database". NOAA National Centers for Environmental Information. doi:10.7289/V5TD9V7K.
