= Coral Bay, Cyprus =

Tourist resort in Cyprus

Coral Bay, Κόλπος των Κοραλλίων
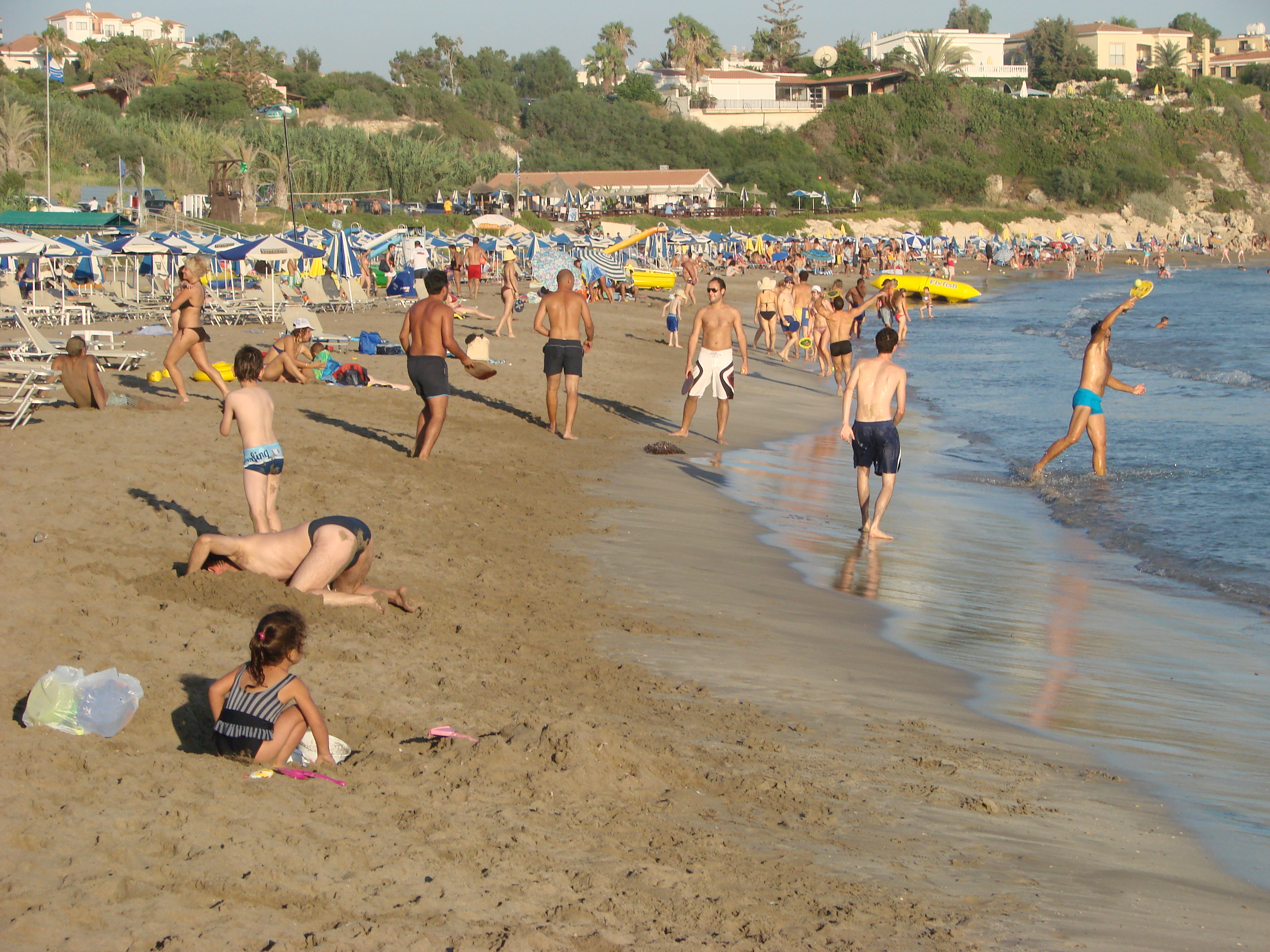
- View of Coral Bay summer 2007

- Location within Cyprus
- Location: Paphos, Cyprus
- Coordinates: 34.854°N 32.3695°E
- Ocean/sea sources: Mediterranean sea
- Basin countries: Cyprus
- Surface area: 2.3 km^{2} (0.89 sq mi)

Coral Bay is a popular tourist resort in the Peyia municipality 11 km north of the city of Paphos.

The coast to the north and to the south of Coral Bay is characterized by rocky headlands and sea caves, Coral Bay itself is a 600m crescent of soft white sand, enclosed by a pair of limestone headlands.

Coral Bay beach carries an EU Blue Flag certification which means that it adheres to all standards, rules and regulations required by the relevant committee of the European Union.

The broader area of Coral Bay encloses another beach called Potima Bay. It is situated about 1.5 km away bordering the boundaries of Kissonerga village.

== See also ==
- Aphrodite hills
