= Paphos Archaeological Museum =

Archaeological museum in Paphos, Cyprus

Coordinates: 34.7716°N 32.4302°E

Paphos Archaeological Museum exhibition in 2023

The Paphos Archaeological Museum (officially the Archaeological Museum of the Pafos District) in Cyprus houses ancient Cypriot art dating from the Epipalaeolithic period (10500–9000 BC) through late antiquity recovered from archaeological sites across the Paphos District in the southwest of the island. Much of the museum's collection includes artifacts from the major Bronze and Iron Age polity of Paphos centered in modern Kouklia, from the Ptolemaic and Roman provincial capital Nea Paphos in modern Paphos, and from ancient Polis.

The museum is in the city of Paphos. It is alternately known as the Archaeological Museum of Paphos.

== History ==
The Paphos Archaeological Museum opened to the public in 1964, shortly after Cypriot independence. It originally comprised two exhibition halls. The Museum was expanded in stages in 1965, 1977, and 1987, and underwent a comprehensive renovation and redesign in 2014–2020.

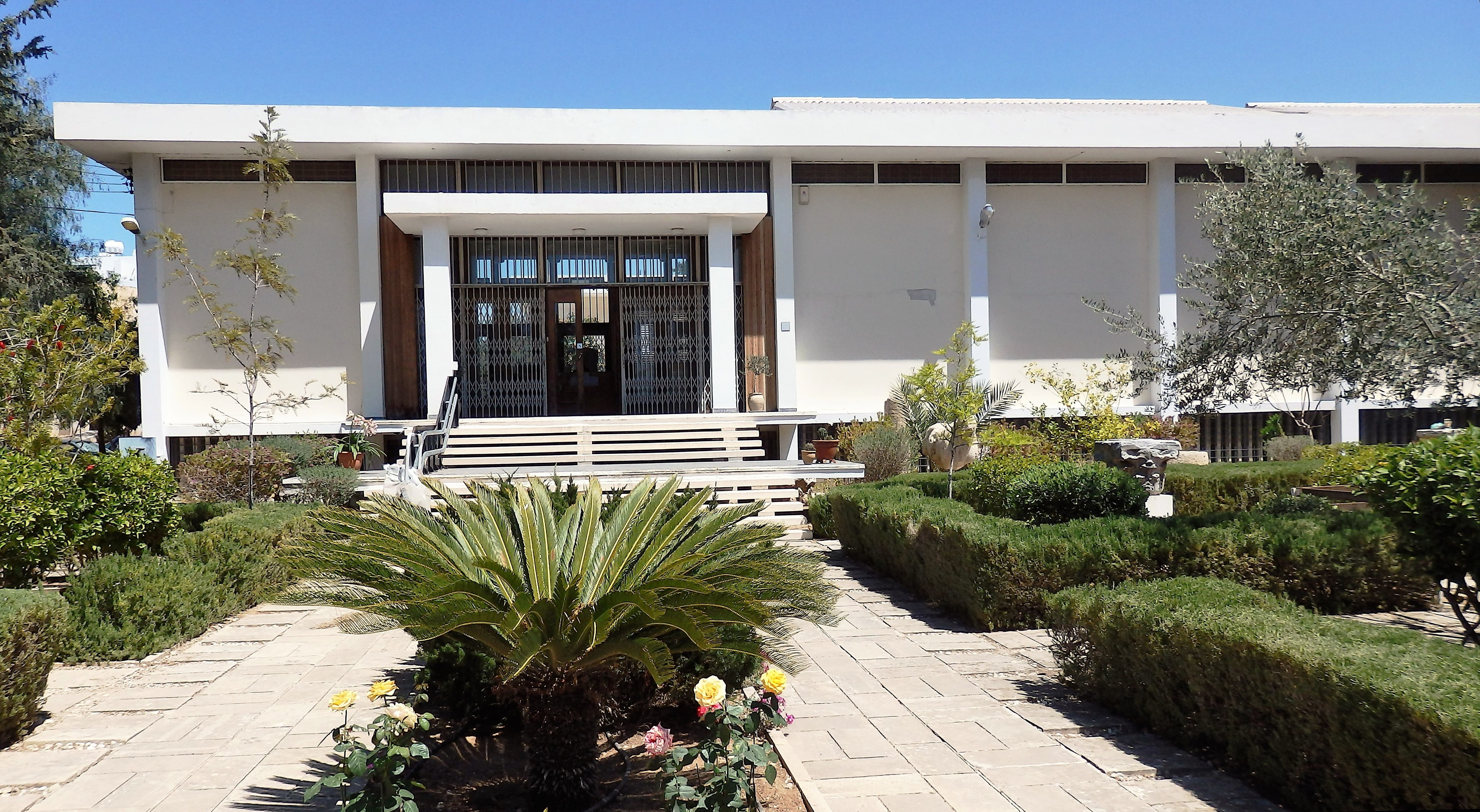
Paphos Archaeological Museum

== Collection ==
The oldest artifacts in the Museum's collection include tools from Epipalaeolithic early hunter-gatherer camps, 9th-millennium BC settlement wells, Chalcolithic Cyprus’s earliest copper artifacts, and cruciform picrolite figurines.

Bronze and Iron Age holdings include material from coastal forts, urban sanctuaries, and tomb assemblages. Artifacts also include royal Paphian coinage, monumental limestone votaries, rural terracotta deposits, and Cypriot syllabic inscriptions.

Artifacts of the Hellenistic and Roman periods include marble statuary, frescoes depicting Apollo and the Muses, and a reconstructed domestic kitchen. Findings from this era also include metal surgical instruments recovered from physicians' tombs and anatomical terracotta hot water bottles designed for therapeutic use.

== Gallery ==
Epipalaeolithic, Chalcolithic

Picrolite cruciform figurines, Souskiou-Laona cemetery.

Bowls, Kissonerga-Mosfilia.

Diabase pestle, Lempa.

Picrolite cruciform pendant.
Bronze and Iron Ages

Plates (Bichrome ware), Kouklia-Skales.

Jugs, Kouklia-Skales.

Geryon figurine, Pegeia.

Standing women figurines, Pegeia.
Hellenistic and Roman

Figurine of a woman.

Silver coins.

Aphrodite Anadyomene.

Clay hot water bottles.

== See also ==
- Sanctuary of Aphrodite Paphia
- Ten city-kingdoms of Cyprus
- Tombs of the Kings (Paphos)
