= Sacred Stone =

Sacred stone may refer to:

== Religion ==
- Baetyl, sacred stones in ancient Asian and European religions
- Benben, in ancient Egyptian religion
- Huwasi stone in Hittite religion
- Omphalos, centre of the world in ancient Greece
- Lapis Niger ("black stone") a shrine in the Roman Forum
- Banalinga, naturally-formed ovoid stones from river-beds in India
- Religion in pre-Islamic Arabia § Sacred stones, a phenomenon common to Semitic religions
- Seonangdang in Korea

== Arts & entertainment ==
- Sacred Stone, 2004 novel by Clive Cussler and Craig Dirgo
- The Six Sacred Stones, 2007–2008 novel by Matthew Reilly
- Fire Emblem: The Sacred Stones, a tactical role-playing game
- Double Dragon III: The Sacred Stones, 1991 Nintendo game
- Legend of the Sacred Stone, Taiwanese puppet film
