= Petra tou Romiou =

Sea stack in Kouklia, Cyprus, also known as Aphrodite's Rock

Coordinates: 34.663517°N 32.62697°E

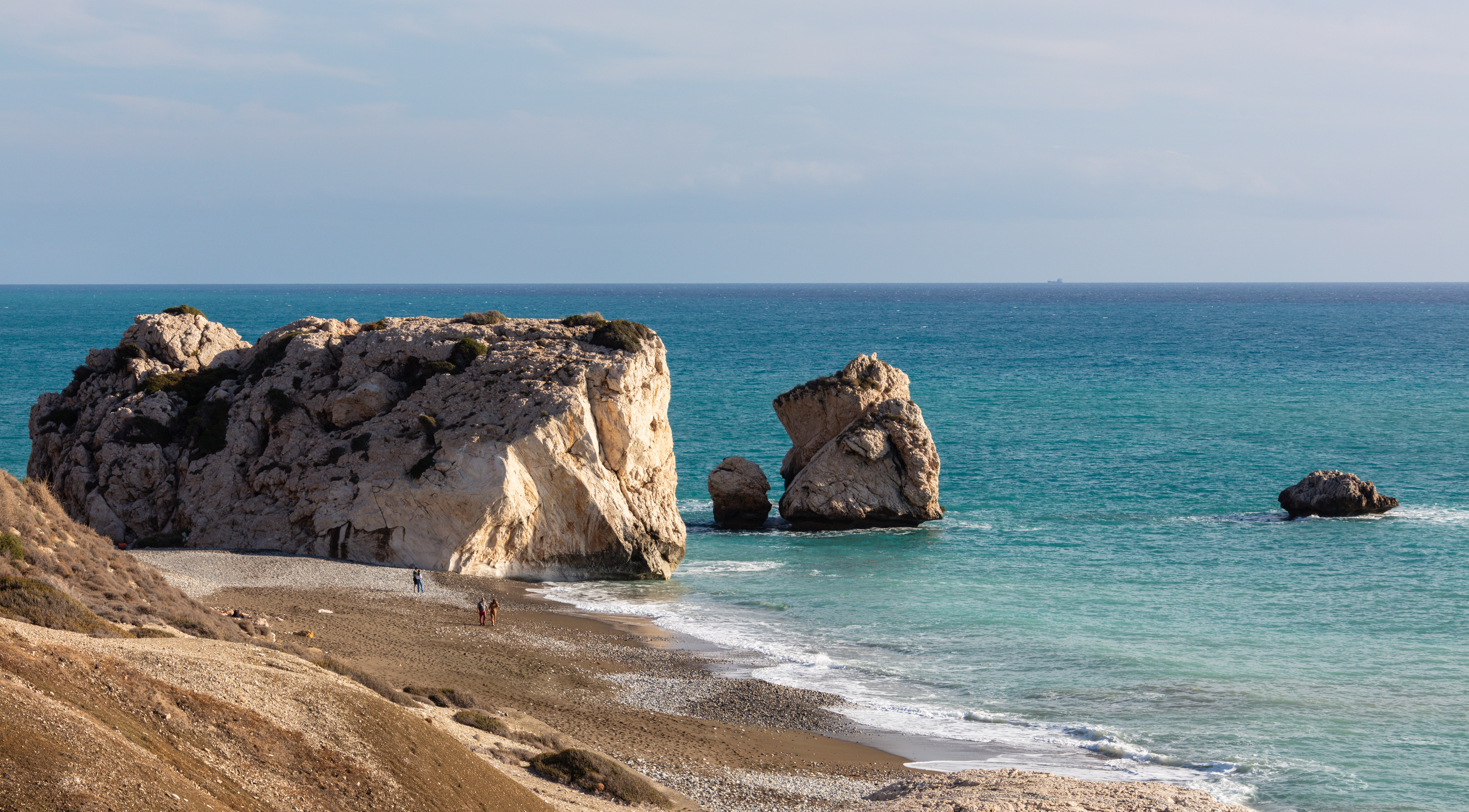
Aphrodite's Rock (December 2021)

Petra tou Romiou (Greek: Πέτρα του Ρωμιού; lit. Rock of the Greek (Note: Greeks after AD 212 referred to themselves as Ῥωμαῖοι (Romaioi) or Ῥωμιοί (Romioi), i.e., Romans, since virtually all Greeks were Roman citizens. See Names of the Greeks#Romans (Ῥωμαῖοι).), also known as Aphrodite's Rock, is a sea stack in Kouklia, Cyprus, the site of ancient Palaepaphos and the Sanctuary of Aphrodite Paphia, founded in the 12th century BC. It is located off the shore along the main road between modern Paphos and Limassol.

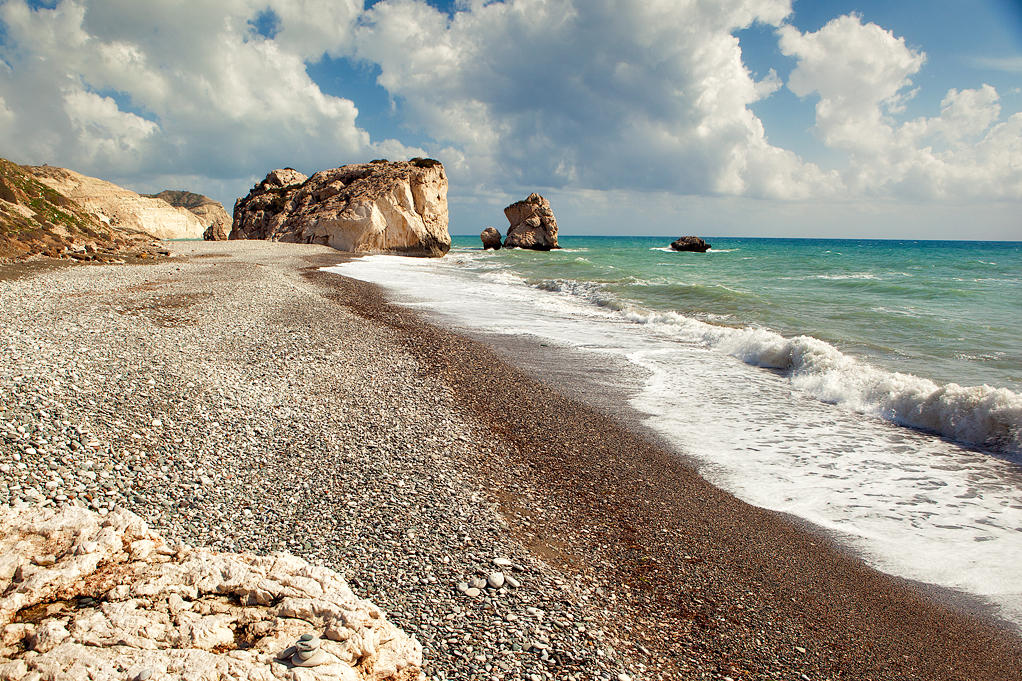
The shore of Petra tou Romiou

The scenic beauty of the area and its mythological tradition as the birthplace of Aphrodite makes it a popular tourist location.

== Legends ==
The Birth of Venus (c. 1485) by Sandro Botticelli

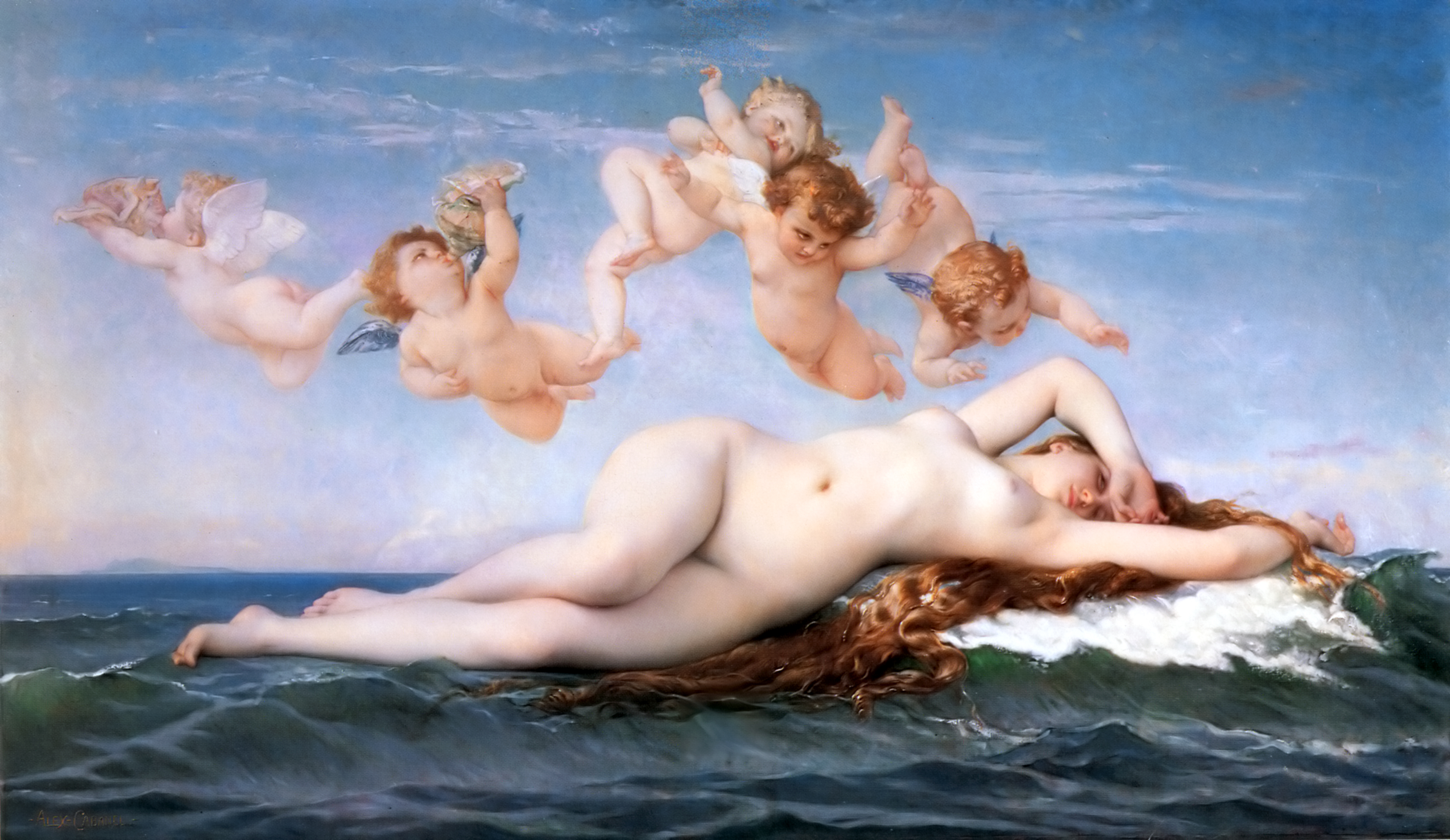
The Birth of Venus (1863) by Alexandre Cabanel

In mythological tradition, the rock is the site of the birth of Aphrodite. In one version of the myth, Gaia (Mother Earth) asked one of her sons, Cronus, to mutilate his father, Uranus (Sky). Cronus cut off Uranus's testicles and threw them into the sea, which caused the sea to foam. According to Hesiod's Theogony, Aphrodite was born out of the sea-foam.

A local tradition says that Aphrodite’s Rock is the lower body of Uranus. Cronus ambushed his father and cut him below the waist with a scythe. Uranus, as he tried to escape flying, lost parts of his truncated body and testicles into the sea. A white foam appeared from which a maiden arose, the waves first taking her to Kythera and then bringing her to Cyprus. The maiden, named Aphrodite, went to the assembly of gods from Cyprus. The Romans widely referred to her as Venus.

Another legend associates the name Achni with the nearby beach, and attributes this to the Achaeans having come ashore here on their return from Troy.

The present name Petra tou Romiou ("Rock of the Greek") associates the place with the exploits of the hero Basil as told in the Digenes Akritas. Basil was half-Byzantine (East Roman or Romios) and half-Arabic, hence the name Digenes (two-blood). Legend tells that the Christian Basil hurled a huge rock from the Troodos Mountains to keep off the invading Saracens. A nearby rock is similarly known as the Saracen Rock.

== See also ==
- Kourion
- Limassol
