= Paphos (ancient city-state) =

Ancient city-state in southwest Cyprus

Paphos (ancient city-state) Πάφος (Greek)
- Largest city: Paphos (Palaepaphos)
- Official languages: Arcadocypriot, Eteocypriot, Greek
- Ethnic groups: Cypriots, Greeks
- Demonym: Paphians

Establishment
  - Settled: c. 1700 BC
  - Dissolved: late 4th century BC
- Today part of: Cyprus

Paphos was a polity of ancient Cyprus located on the Mediterranean coast in the southwest of the island. Paphos was a major economic and religious hub in the eastern Mediterranean from the Middle Bronze Age until its dissolution at the start of the Hellenistic period. Its port and administrative center was the homonymous settlement of Paphos (later Palaepaphos), established c. 1700 BC near modern Kouklia. In the Iron Age, Paphos was known as a polis (city-state) or "city-kingdom" of Cyprus. (Note: The term "ten city-kingdoms" is doubly imprecise by standards of modern scholarship. It derived from a 673–672 BC tribute list of the Neo-Assyrian king Esarhaddon. The actual number of polities fluctuated over time until their final dissolution under the Ptolemies in the late 4th century BC, and the designation "city-kingdom" has been called into question in favor of the more conventional terms "city-state" or "polis".) It is unknown to what degree the ancient polity's regional influence approximated the boundaries of the modern Paphos District.

With the dissolution of Paphos under Ptolemaic rule, the city of Nea Paphos was established as a provincial capital and port, while Palaepaphos remained an important cultic site throughout the Hellenistic and Roman periods until the early Christian era when the Sanctuary of Aphrodite Paphia was closed.

UNESCO inscribed the ruins of Paphos as a World Heritage Site in 1980. It is a serial property consisting of three components: Palaepaphos ("Old Paphos", in modern Kouklia); Nea Paphos; and the Tombs of the Kings. Much of ancient Paphos is under archaeological excavation, managed by the Cyprus Department of Antiquities.

== Naming conventions ==
The ancient polity of Paphos originated with the Bronze Age settlement called "Paphos", established in the 17th century BC near modern Kouklia. It would emerge as the administrative, trade, and cultic center of the larger polity which would bear the settlement's name. The polity was dissolved in the 4th century BC, and its founding settlement became known as Palaepaphos (Old Paphos) following the establishment of Nea Paphos (New Paphos) as a new port and later capital of Ptolemaic and then Roman Cyprus in the Kato Pafos district of the modern city of Paphos in the Paphos District.

Ancient geographers frequently confused Palaepaphos and Nea Paphos. To avoid confusing all the similarly-named entities, a modern convention refers to the polity (whether defined as polis or "city-kingdom") as Paphos (or the Paphian city-state or Paphian polis to distinguish it from the modern city), to its earliest settlement and long-time capital as Palaepaphos (anachronistically if before 4th century BC) or Kouklia-Palaepaphos (also anachronistically), and to the city founded at the time of Paphos's dissolution as Nea Paphos. The Romans referred to the old capital at modern Kouklia as Palaipaphos or Palaipafos.

== History ==
The earliest human settlers of Cyprus arrived from Anatolia, the Levant, and the Balkans. Human habitation in the site around Kouklia-Palaepaphos began in the Neolithic (c. 10,000–5500 BC). There is evidence of cult activity dedicated to local fertility deities occurring at the site as early as the 6th millennium BC.

Mortar and diabase pestle, with a limestone bowl. Kissonerga-Mosfilia, Late Chalcolithic period, 2800-2500 BC. Archaeological Museum of Paphos

=== Bronze Age ===
The first evidence of permanent human settlement on the site of Kouklia-Palaepaphos is dated to c. 1700 BC, in the Middle Bronze Age. It was likely established as the terminus of a network of settlements whose economies were based on the mining and transport of copper, developing around a natural harbor and two inland copper transport routes along the Diarizos and Ezousas river valleys. (Note: See map in Radner (2025), "The political geography of Cyprus in the 8th century BC. From D. W. Rupp, 'Puttin' on the Ritz: Manifestations of High Status in Iron Age Cyprus', in E. Peltenburg (ed.), Early Society in Cyprus, Edinburgh 1989, 347 fig. 38.5.") The site's proximity to rivers and its estuary anchorage (Note: As the harbor had silted up by 4th century BC, details—including its possible locations and names—are vague. Historical sources refer to a harbor at Paphos on the mouth of a "Bocarus" river, and some of these same sources equate the Bocarus with the Diarizos. See Iacovou (2019) passim for the current state of research.) made its location ideal for commercial export of the mineral, and provided the fresh water necessary to sustain a permanent settlement.

Copper ingot from ancient Cyprus, undated. Altes Museum, Berlin.

Cyprus possessed vast reserves of copper, the name of which derives from that of the island itself. (Note: The name of the metal derives from the Latin aes cyprium meaning 'metal of Cyprus', which became cuprum in Late Latinand coper in Old English; copper is first attested in the 12th century.) Copper is essential for bronze production, which made Bronze Age Cyprus—the island or a polity on the island was known as "Alashiya" in this period as evidenced by the Amarna letters—a geopolitical focal point in the Eastern Mediterranean. Regional powers and Cypriot polities competed continuously for control over the island's copper supply throughout the Bronze and Iron Ages.

Cyprus largely escaped the Late Bronze Age collapse of the late 13th and early 12th centuries that destroyed Aegean palace economies, and avoided the destruction and foreign colonization that affected neighboring regional centers. Settlements across the island experienced an influx of displaced laborers from inland regions and of Mycenaean Greek settlers who gradually integrated with the local population. The Sanctuary of Aphrodite was constructed in the 12th century BC; its monumental ashlar temenos matches contemporary designs at Kition.

The remains of the Bronze Age temenos wall of the Sanctuary of Aphrodite Paphia, dated to the 12th century BC. Kouklia-Palaepaphos.

=== Iron Age ===
By the Cypro-Geometric I period (Note: Periods of Cyprus's history from 1050 BC have been named according to styles of pottery found, as follows: Cypro-Geometric I: 1050–950 BC; Cypro-Geometric II: 950–900 BC; Cypro-Geometric III: 900–750 BC; Cypro-Archaic I: 750–600 BC; Cypro-Archaic II: 600–480 BC; Cypro-Classical I: 480–400 BC; Cypro-Classical II: 400–310 BC) (1050–950 BC), the settlement at Kouklia-Palaepaphos was as an important Iron Age manufacturing and maritime trading city and administrative seat of the emergent city-state of Paphos. It pioneered the production and export of forged iron and was a major port on the long-distance trade routes that crossed the Mediterranean.

Zoomorphic askos from Kouklia-Palaepaphos. Cypro-Geometric I period, 11th century BC.

Unlike the geopolitically fragmented polities of eastern Cyprus, the Paphian city-state maintained territorial integrity and uncontested control over its resource-rich hinterland. Direct access to copper deposits and shipbuilding timber in the Troodos Mountains throughout the Cypro-Geometric periods (c. 950–700 BC) generated substantial wealth, reflected in extensive chamber tomb cemeteries in Kouklia-Palaepaphos. The Sanctuary of Aphrodite Paphia complex in Kouklia-Palaepaphos operated as both religious center and government seat overseeing the Paphian city-state's metallurgy and maritime trade.

The city-state of Paphos remained stable into the 8th century BC. Among other evidence of continuity is the uninterrupted use of Linear-derived scripts (Cypro-Minoan and Cypro-Syllabic) for both Greek and Eteocypriot languages, from the polity's Late Bronze Age roots into its emergence as the autonomous Cypro-Archaic Paphian city-state.

=== The "city-kingdoms" of Cyprus ===
The ancient "city-kingdoms" of Cyprus. Paphos is in the southwest.

In the 9th and 8th centuries BC, the Neo-Assyrian Empire extended its influence over Cyprus in order to secure its access to copper. Neo-Assyrian royal inscriptions from the 7th century BC document direct client relationships with Cypriot polities, recording the Paphian city-state among ten major Cypriot "city-kingdoms" (Note: See note [a].) paying the empire tribute.

These autonomous poleis or "city-kingdoms" largely endured through the Cypro-Archaic periods (750–480 BC) and into the Cypro-Classical (480–310). Even under the sway of foreign powers, the city-state of Paphos maintained political and religious authority over its rural hinterlands, which included farming communities and highland sanctuary sites, into the late 4th century BC.

=== Egyptian and Achaemenid Persian rule ===
Neo-Assyrian rule of Cyprus ended in 669 BC; Egypt assumed control between 570 and 526/525 BC. The island came under Persian Achaemenid control around 545 BC. Paphos was one of the Cypriot polities which joined the Ionian Revolt against the Persians in 499–498 BC. In response, Persian forces laid siege to Palaepaphos and proceeded to quash the revolt. Persia would continue to control the Paphian city-state and the whole of Cyprus until 330 BC, when the Macedonian armies of Alexander the Great conquered Persia.

=== Hellenistic rule and dissolution ===
Following the death of Alexander in 323 BC and the conclusion of the Wars of the Diadochi in 272 BC, Cyprus came under Ptolemaic control. This era brought complete Hellenization across the island.

==== End of maritime Palaepaphos and founding of Nea Paphos ====
Palaepaphos suffered a fate common amongst maritime cities in the ancient world: the gradual unusability of its harbor due to siltation. (Note: Palaepaphos, like numerous ancient maritime cities, located its harbor in a river estuary. This location sheltered anchored vessels from the sea and provided ready access to fresh water. But the estuary siting also brought the gradual siltation of the harbor by fluvial sediment processes. Transported sediment is moved along the coastline by wave-driven littoral drift. Half of the known ancient Mediterranean harbors are no longer in use; around 15% of these are silted-up.) When the harbor became too shallow for seagoing vessels to enter—as had evidently happened at Kouklia-Palaepaphos even before the 4th century BC—the harbor became unusable and was abandoned.

Nicocles of Paphos founded Nea Paphos (New Paphos) to serve as the administrative and maritime capital under Ptolemaic administration. The site was chosen primarily for its excellent deep-water anchorage to replace the unusable harbor at the old capital city at Kouklia-Palaepaphos. The original capital then became known as Palaepaphos (Old Paphos); ancient authors often confused the two by calling them both "Paphos". The city-state of Paphos, along with the other polities of Cyprus, was formally dissolved under Ptolemaic rule in the 3rd century BC, and Ptolemy I Soter forced Nicocles commit suicide for taking part in a plot against him.

After the dissolution of the Paphian city-state, Nea Paphos became a wealthy port city and provincial capital. The Roman Republic acquired Cyprus in 58 BC and formally established the province of Roman Cyprus in 22 BC. Kouklia-Palaepaphos and the Sanctuary of Aphrodite (Venus to the Romans) were renowned religious sites until the early Christan era.

== The Paphian syllabary ==
The local writing tradition of Paphos originated in the transition from the Late Bronze Age Cypro-Minoan script to the Greek language around the 10th and 9th centuries BC, ultimately evolving into a distinct regional writing system known as the Paphian syllabary.

The late 8th century BC onward saw the emergence of the Arcadocypriot Greek dialect in Paphos. It was written in the native Cypriot syllabic script and was the official Paphian political and administrative language, while other Cypriot polities adopted the Phoenician alphabet or used the indigenous Eteocypriot language.

Over 500 syllabic inscriptions found within Paphian territory document three chronologically distinct variants: Old (6th century BC); Middle (5th century BC); and Late Paphian (late 4th century BC). Each variant is characterized by specific sign repertoires. In the late 4th century BC, Nicocles, the polity's final monarch, introduced a reformed and archaicizing version of the Paphian Cypro-syllabic script to strengthen his legitimacy amidst the destabilizing wars of the Diadochi.

Stone tablet with Cypro-syllabic inscription. Kritou Tera-Fytefkia, Cypro-Classical II period, 4th century BC. Archaeological Museum of Paphos

A smaller corpus of Paphian syllabic inscriptions was found outside Cyprus, dated to the Cypro-Archaic period through the 3rd century BC. These inscriptions were uncovered in Italy, Greece, Egypt, Nubia, and Phoenicia, on ceramic vessels, marble stelae, seals, coins, and temple walls. Votive dedications discovered at the Phoenician sites of Sidon and Tel Dor record religious offerings, while ownership marks on amphorae from Italy and Greece indicate the movement of goods or merchants. Graffiti incised by Cypriot mercenaries has been identified at Karnak in Egypt. The graffiti records the soldiers' names, patronymics, and origins.

== Kouklia-Palaepaphos ==
=== Settlement history ===
Permanent human occupation at Kouklia-Palaepaphos began in the Middle Bronze Age, around 1700 BC, likely beginning as a coastal terminus of inland copper transport networks along the Diarizos and Ezousas valleys around a natural harbor for seaborne cargo ships. Copper is the base metal of bronze, the foundation of ancient Eastern Mediterranean metallurgic technology that gave the period its name. The broader Kouklia-Palaepaphos settlement was within the Paphos hydrological basin, which provided the territory necessary to connect inland copper extraction sites in the Paphos Forest—approximately 25 km inland—to the natural harbor. The region experienced a sharp increase in settlement density with its founding; the number of sites in the Paphos basin nearly doubled from 25 to 45 as the urban nucleus of Palaepaphos took shape during this time.

==== Seat of the Bronze and Iron Age city-state ====
By the Late Bronze Age (LC IIC–IIIA, 12th century BC), Palaepaphos was flourishing as the primary cultural and economic center of southwestern Cyprus. The Sanctuary of Aphrodite was constructed near the harbor at this time; it functioned primarily as the political-economic core and urban cult center for the emergent Paphian city-state. The Sanctuary comprised an open courtyard (temenos) enclosed by a perimeter wall of massive ashlar blocks. Its remains include the western wall, a section of the southern wall, and a hall that held a central conical baetyl which is thought to have symbolized the goddess.

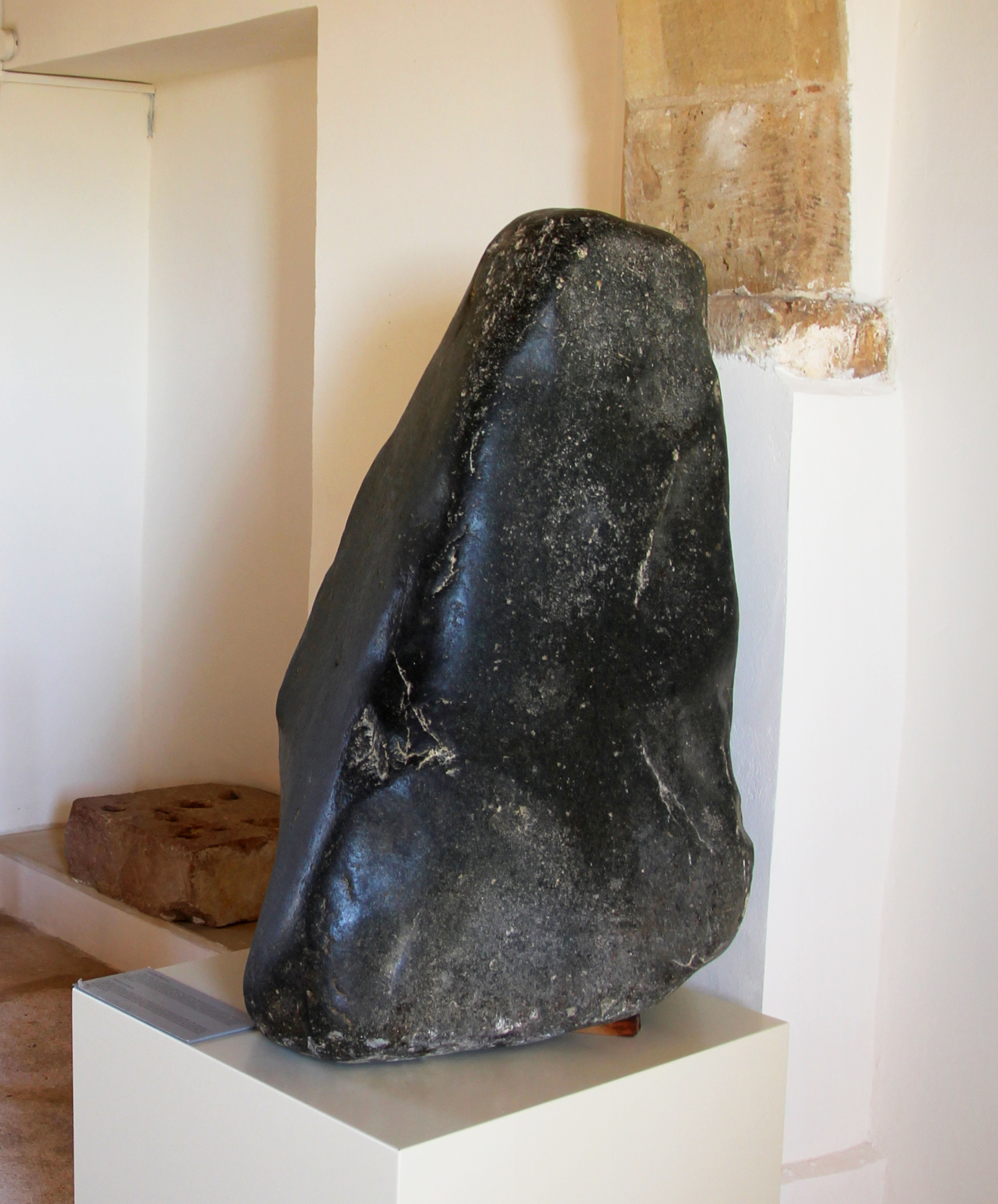
Baetyl stone, cult symbol of Aphrodite

The urban layout of Palaepaphos extended from the coastal center to plateaus in the north and east. Fortifications and ramparts were distributed around the settlement, positioned to command the river valleys and coastal approaches from the plateaus. The most prominent of the plateaus are known today as Marcello Hill (Marchello), Mantissa, and Hadjiabdoulla; (Note: See Raptou (2018), Fig.1, "Topographic map of the Palaepaphos site".) digital imaging shows that they were specialized functional zones. They contain a dense arrangement of structures, the oldest of which date to the Late Bronze Age. The nucleus of the city was surrounded by a nearly circular perimeter of necropolises at the sites of Skales, Xylinos, Xerolimni, and Plakes.

During the Cypro-Archaic and Cypro-Classical periods, Palaepaphos was the largest urban and religious center of western Cyprus. Its plateaus were occupied by non-contiguous clusters of residential and administrative buildings. The Marchello and Hadjiabdoulla hilltops alternately housed successive administrative centers; a palace facility uncovered at Hadjiabdoulla is dated to the Cypro-Classical.

Remains of fortifications on Marchello Hill

Palaepaphos was besieged by the Persian Achaemenids in 499–498 BC, in response to the city-state joining the ill-fated Ionian Revolt. Persian forces constructed a massive assault ramp to overcome the city walls, having dismantled a nearby Archaic-era sanctuary for material. Paphian defenders constructed underground sallyports and mined the ramp to induce its collapse. Persia quashed the Ionian Revolt and would continue to exercise control over Cyprus until the conquest of the Achaemenid Empire by Alexander the Great in 330 BC.

==== After dissolution of the polis ====
The harbor at Palaepaphos had become unusable (Note: See note [g].) even before the late 4th-century BC foundation of Nea Paphos with its superior deepwater anchorage. Following the dissolution of the Paphian polis and the establishment of Ptolemaic rule over Cyprus, the now officially-renamed Palaepaphos (Old Paphos) continued to grow. New residential areas expanded westward onto the Sanctuary plateaus at Alonia, Kato Alonia, and Palaealona, and a new necropolis at nearby Phones served as the city's principal burial grounds.

In the Roman era, Palaepaphos—"Palaipafos" to Latin speakers—maintained its regional importance. It was the seat of the Koinon Kyprion (Confederation of the Cypriots), the provincial assembly which managed island-wide religious affairs, directed the imperial cult, and oversaw Cyprus's minting of bronze coins.

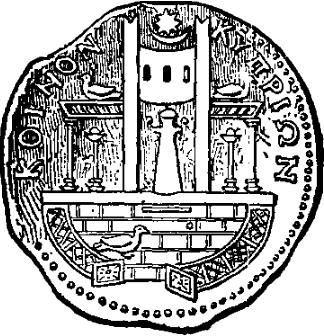
Cypriot coin from the reign of Caracalla (2nd/3rd century AD), depicting the Temple of Aphrodite (Venus) at Palaipafos. It reads "KOINON KYPRION" (Confederation of the Cypriots).

Private construction in Palaipafos peaked in the late 1st to early 2nd century AD with the building of high-status residences such as the House of Leda at Alonia.

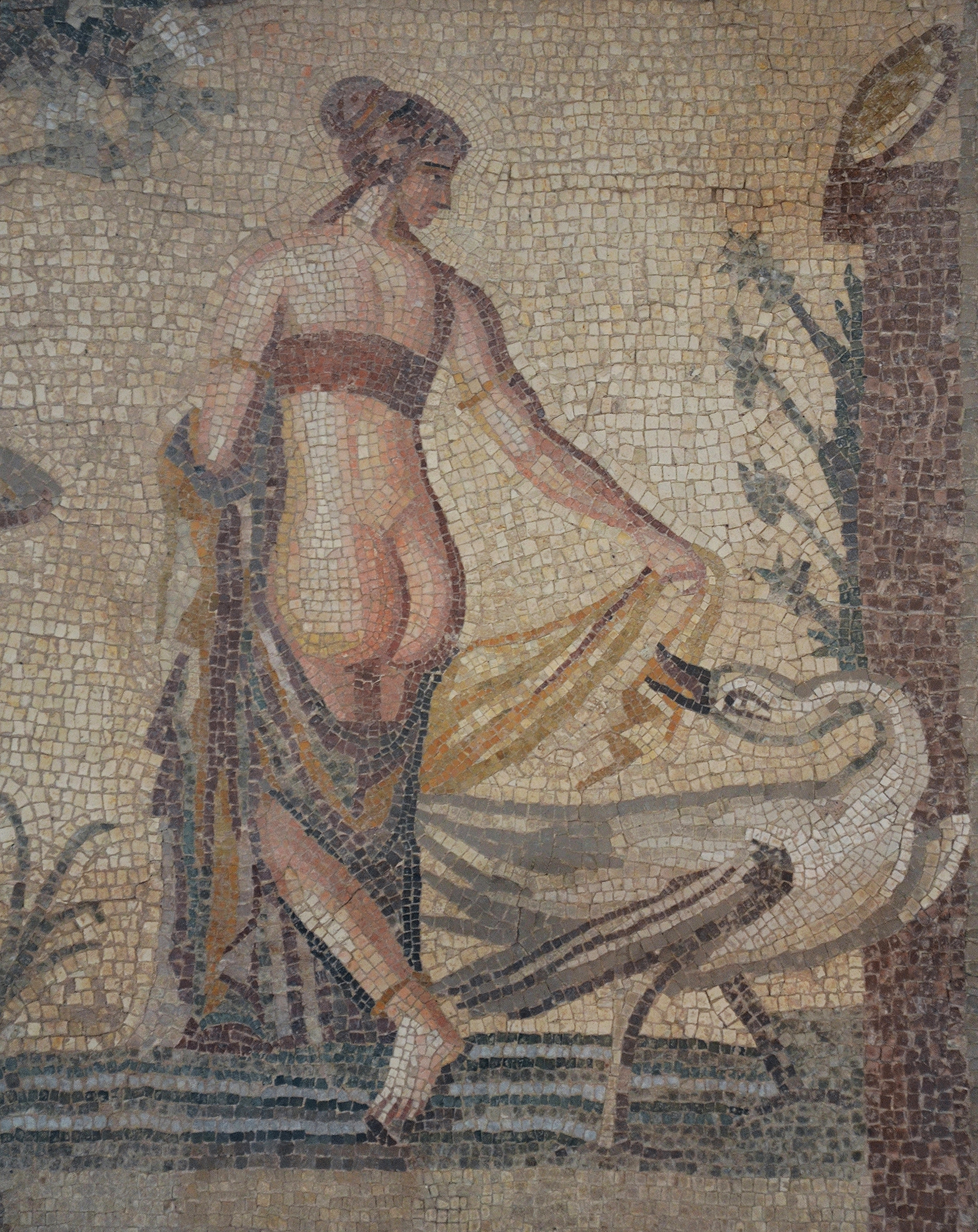
Mosaic depicting Leda and the Swan from the House of Leda, Palaifos, late 2nd - early 3rd century AD

Operation of the Sanctuary of Aphrodite Pafia continued into late antiquity. Roman construction north of the original sanctuary site in the late 1st to early 2nd century AD would give the cult center its canonical monumental form as the Roman Temple of Venus in Palaipafos. These Roman structures included a large court open on its northern, eastern, and southern sides.

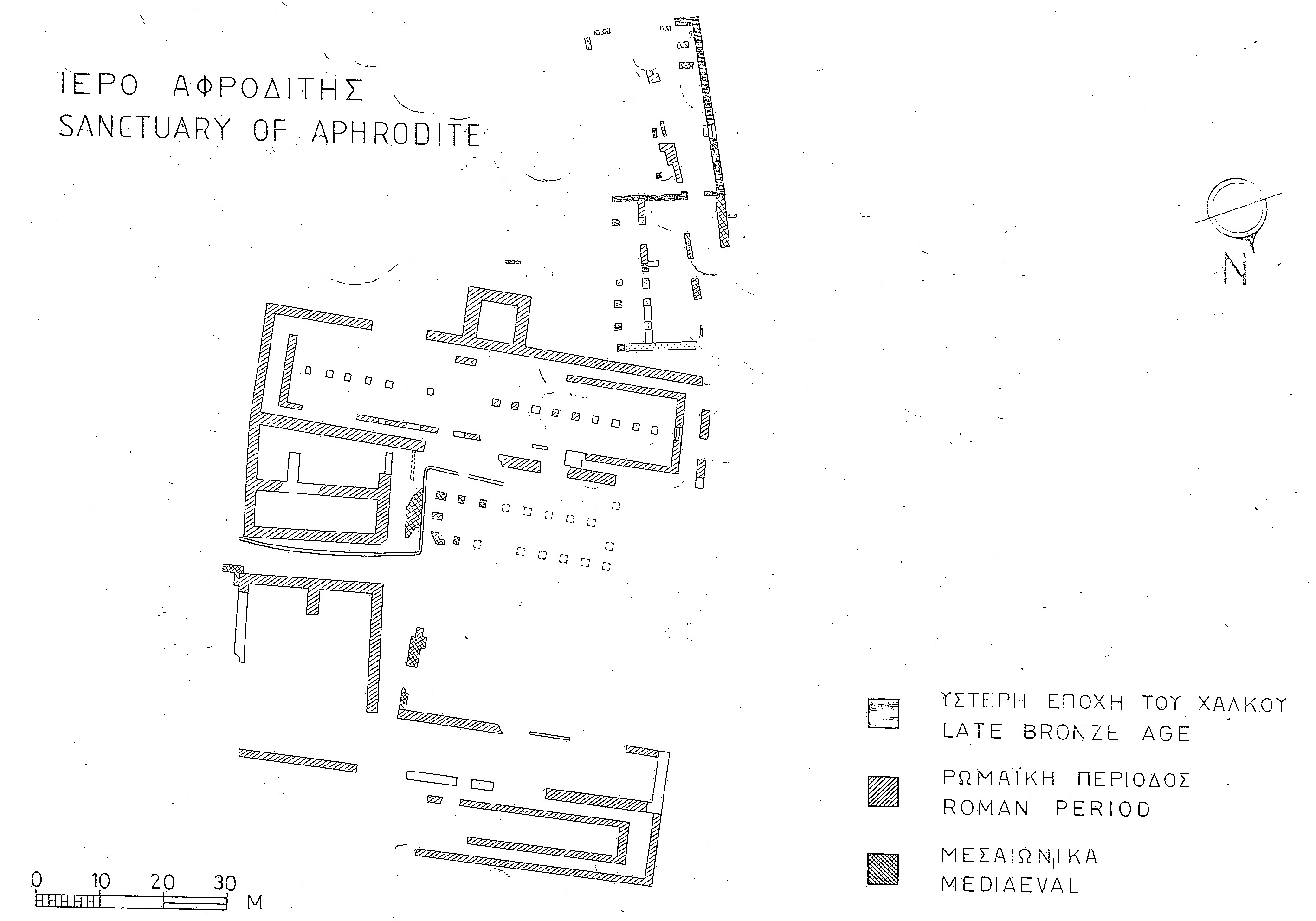
The Roman Sanctuary of Aphrodite Paphia, plan with original Bronze Age structure shown

Religious and cultural activities at the Temple of Venus in Palaipafos came to an end in the 4th century AD as Christianity spread across the island and pagan cultic sites were forcibly shut down by the church. In the medieval period, Palaipafos became known as Couvouclia (from which "Kouklia" is possibly derived) and was the headquarters for officials of the House of Lusignan who oversaw sugarcane cultivation and refining across the Paphos region.

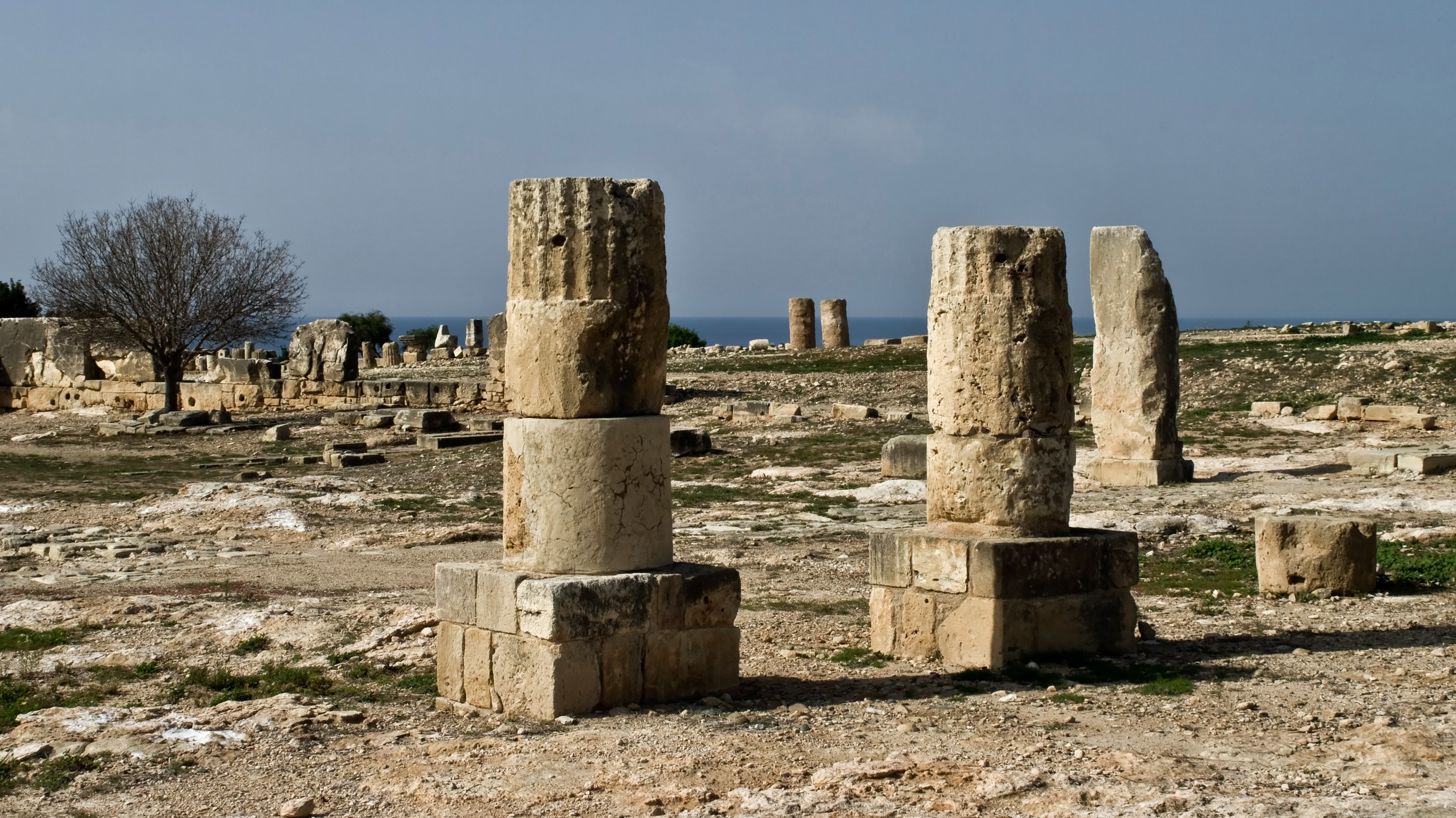
Roman-era ruins of the Sanctuary of Aphrodite/Temple of Venus in Palaipafos.

=== Mythological and cult traditions ===
==== Foundation myths ====
According to epic and mythological traditions, Palaepaphos and the Sanctuary of Aphrodite were founded by Agapenor, King of Tegea in Arcadia, after the Trojan War. An alternate native tradition attributes the Aphrodite cult's early establishment to Cinyras, who is noted in the Iliad. In this tradition, Cinyras's descendants the Cinyradai served as hereditary priests at the Sanctuary in Palaepaphos. The ancient geographers Strabo and Pausanias mistakenly identified Nea Paphos as Agapenor's original foundation site, a historiographical error contradicted both by Mycenaean remains at Palaepaphos and by the historicity the new capital's 4th-century BC.

During the late 4th century BC, Paphians actively venerated local agricultural deities as documented by Cypro-Syllabic inscriptions discovered at Tala. Among these deities was the grain-harvest goddess "wo-lo-we-a", whom scholars link to Demeter.

==== The cult of Aphrodite ====
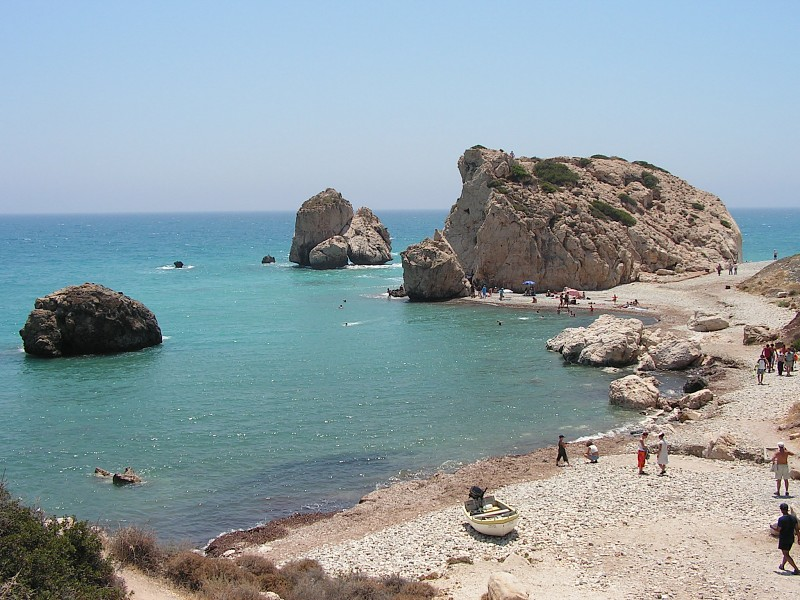
Petra tou Romiou ("The rock of the Greek") or "Aphrodite's Rock", mythical birthplace of the goddess in Palaepaphos, modern Kouklia

Scholars identify the Aphrodite cult's early origins in Late Bronze Age Cyprus as a synthesis of Aegean, Near Eastern, and local Mediterranean elements. Cypriot and Paphian tradition revered Palaepaphos as the birthplace of the cult, holding that the goddess landed on its shores and established her sanctuary there.

After the late 4th-century BC foundation of Nea Paphos and the subsequent incorporation of Cyprus into the Greco-Roman world, the Sanctuary of Aphrodite Paphia began to function primarily as a long-distance pan-Mediterranean pilgrimage destination.

The Sanctuary was widely noted in classical literature, beginning with the Homeric epics. Strabo later recorded the annual 60-stadia ritual procession connecting Old and New Paphos (Palaepaphos and Nea Paphos). Roman-era Augustan coinage offers valuable visual depictions of the temple's architectural layout and its central aniconic stone.

=== Legacy ===
After the establishment of Nea Paphos and the dissolution of the city-state of Paphos, the city of ancient Palaepaphos remained a subject of popular and scholarly interest into the modern era. Textual sources focus almost exclusively on the Sanctuary of Aphrodite and largely ignore Palaepaphos's important early history as a major Bronze and Iron Age maritime polity. The city's harbor had become unusable well before the capital's relocation, and littoral transformations moved the coastline seaward, stranding the port complex and the Sanctuary inland and effectively hiding their former proximity to the sea. (Note: See notes [c] and [g].)

Map of Kouklia-Palaepaphos, 1811, by Joseph von Hammer-Purgstall, from his Topographic views collected on a trip to the Levant

Literary mentions of Paphos go back as far as Homer, who named Paphos and the goddess in the Iliad and Odyssey. The majority of surviving Greek and Latin accounts of Palaepaphos date to the island's Roman period and include 4th-century Christian polemics directed against the pagan cult center. During the Renaissance and early modern eras, European humanists turned to classical literary sources in attempts to locate the Sanctuary. It proved difficult for these early visitors to identify the temenos due to coastal transformations and the absence of a recognizable Greek-style temple.

=== Historiography ===
Conventional scholarship long posited that the urban settlement of Palaepaphos originated from the Sanctuary of Aphrodite and identified the sanctuary and its cultic activities as the primary driver of the city's growth. According to this historiographical tradition, the political power, economic stability, and lasting prominence of Paphos derived principally from revenues generated by tourism to the sacred precinct. Scholars assumed that the sanctuary functioned from its earliest phase as a pan-Mediterranean pilgrimage destination. Scholars also assumed that a continuous defensive rampart fully enclosed the city to demarcate a rigid boundary between intra muros and extra muros (inside and outside city walls) urban zones.

Recent archaeological research has overturned these long-standing conventional assumptions regarding the origin, extent, and economic underpinning of Palaepaphos.

New discoveries show that human settlement preceded the sanctuary rather than originating from it. Rather than driving the economy, the shrine operated primarily as a localized cult center until its later expansion, and the city's prosperity was initially fueled by trade and the working and export of copper. Excavations also disprove the assumed presence of a continuous defensive circuit; instead, the site comprised dispersed settlement clusters across surrounding plateaus, without a rigid boundary separating intra and extra muros zones.

=== Archaeology ===
In 1887, British scholars conducted the first systematic archaeological excavations of the Kouklia-Palaepaphos sanctuary complex. Current studies across the extent of occupation sites in Kouklia-Palaepaphos undertaken by the University of Cyprus include the use of digital imaging to map the ancient coastline and locate sites in relation to the city's harbor and maritime history.

The Local Archaeological Museum of Palaipafos in Kouklia (often called the Kouklia Museum) and the Archaeological Museum of the Pafos District (Paphos Archaeological Museum) maintain large collections of finds from ancient Palaepaphos and vicinity.

== Paphos UNESCO World Heritage Site ==
UNESCO inscribed Paphos as a World Heritage Site in 1980 under criterion (iii) for its unique testimony to a vanished civilization and criterion (vi) for its direct association with events or traditions of outstanding universal value.

The Paphos World Heritage Site is a serial archaeological property comprising three components across two geographic locations: Kato Paphos (Site I) and Kouklia (Site II). The Kouklia site includes Palaepaphos and the remains of the Sanctuary of Aphrodite. The Kato Paphos site contains the ancient Hellenistic and Roman city of Nea Paphos and the subterranean necropolis of Tafoi ton Vasileon ("Tombs of the Kings").

== Image gallery ==
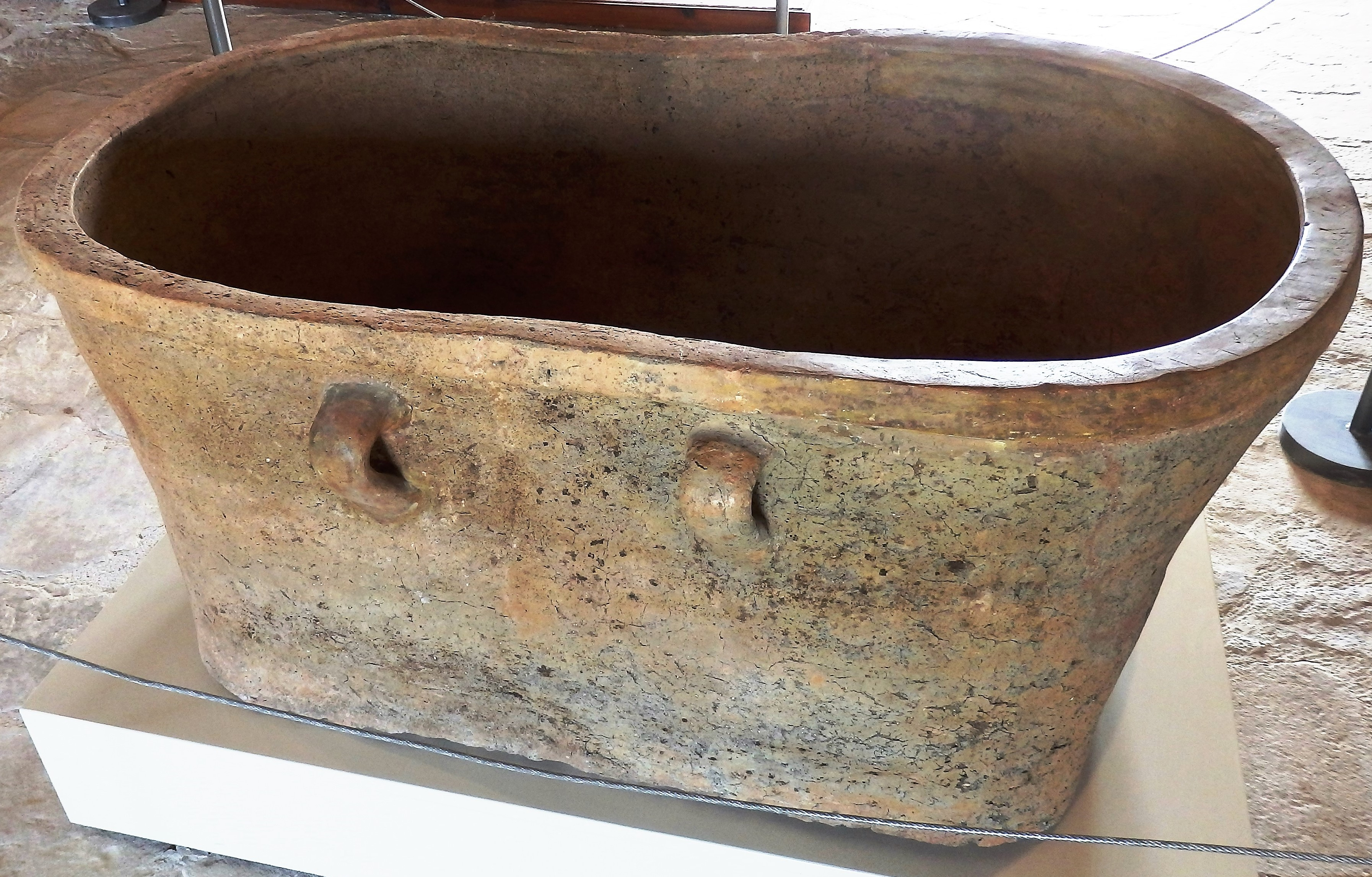
Bathtub, Late Bronze Age (1650–1050 BC) Palaepaphos. Kouklia Museum

Horn-shaped terracotta vessels (white painted ware) from Palaepaphos necropolis, Kouklia. Cypro-Geometric I period, 11th century BC. Paphos Archaeological Museum.

Barrel-shaped jugs and pointed jug from Kouklia-Skales. Cypro-Geometric I period, 11th century BC. Archaeological Museum of Paphos

Plates Bichrome ware plates from Palaepaphos, Kouklia-Skales. Cypro-Geometric I period (11th century BC).

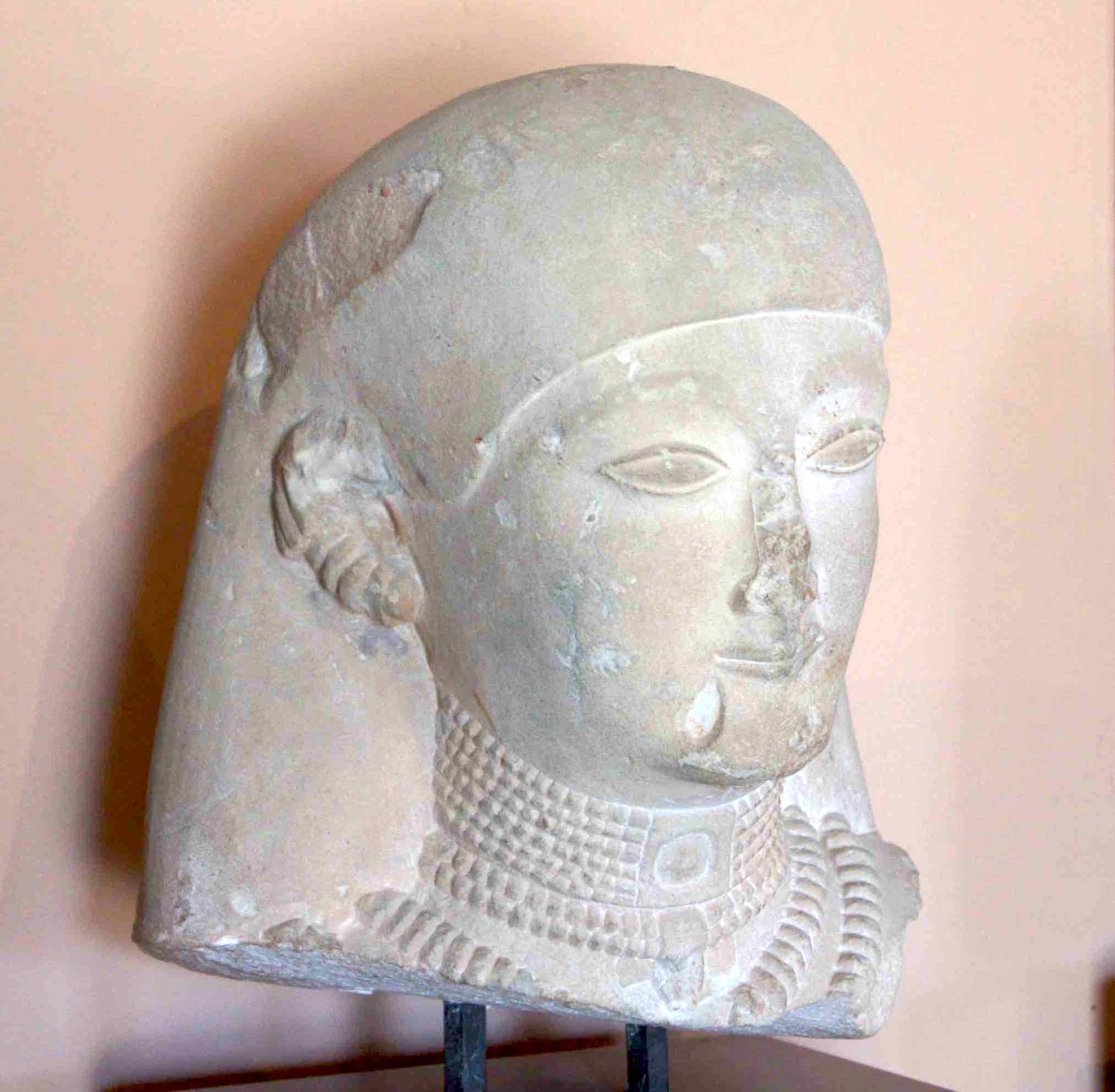
Head of woman, Archaic period, 7th-6th century BC. Kouklia Museum

Limestone statue of standing male figure with Egyptian crown, Kouklia-Marchello. Cypro-Archaic II period, 6th century BC. Archaeological Museum of Paphos

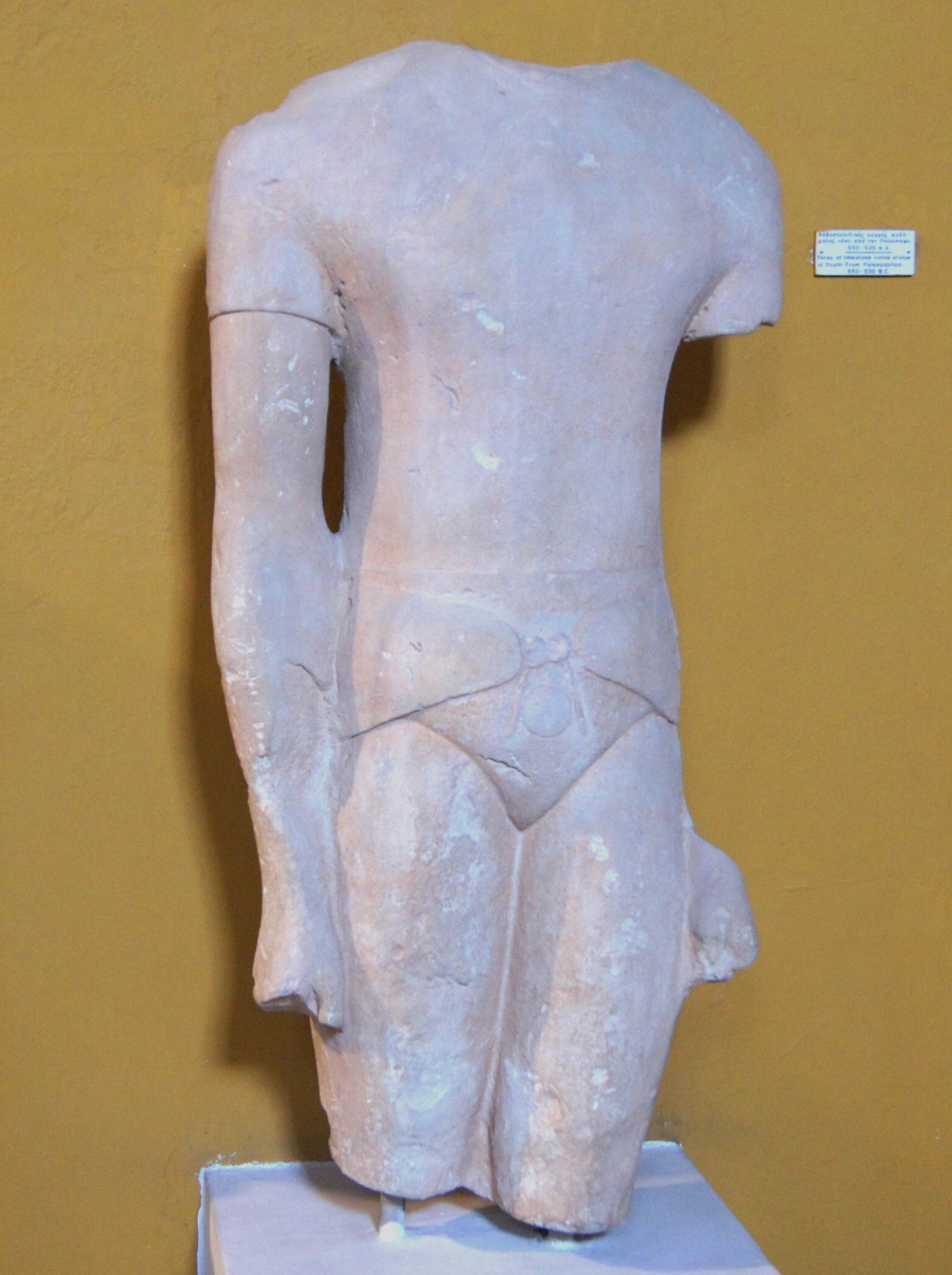
Kouros statue from Palaepaphos, 550-500 BC. Nicosia Museum

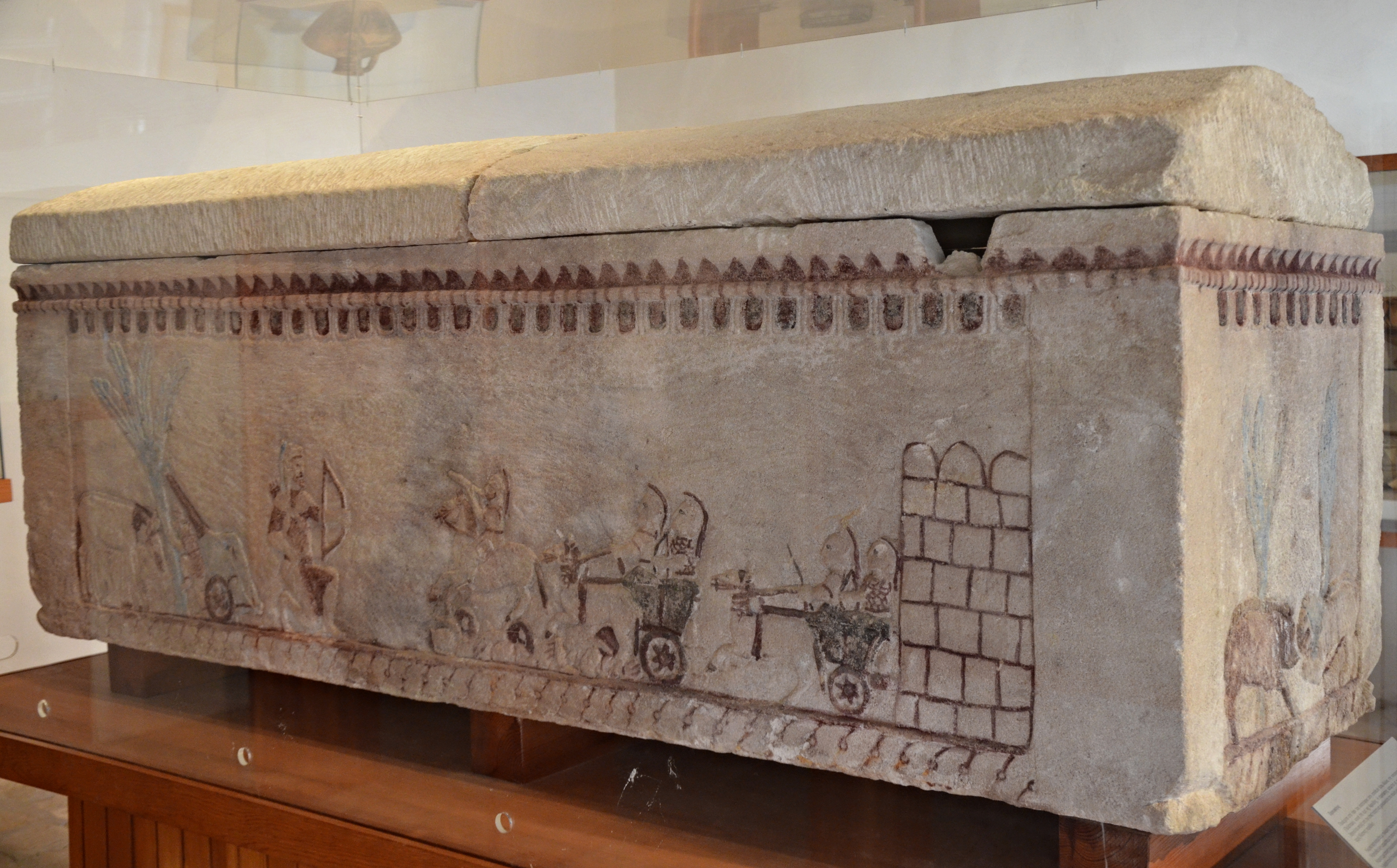
Limestone sarcophagus painted with Homeric scenes, from tomb near Palaepaphos, 5th century BC. Palaepaphos Museum

Sarcophagus detail, 5th century BC. Palaepaphos Museum

Sarcophagus detail, 5th century BC. Palaepaphos Museum

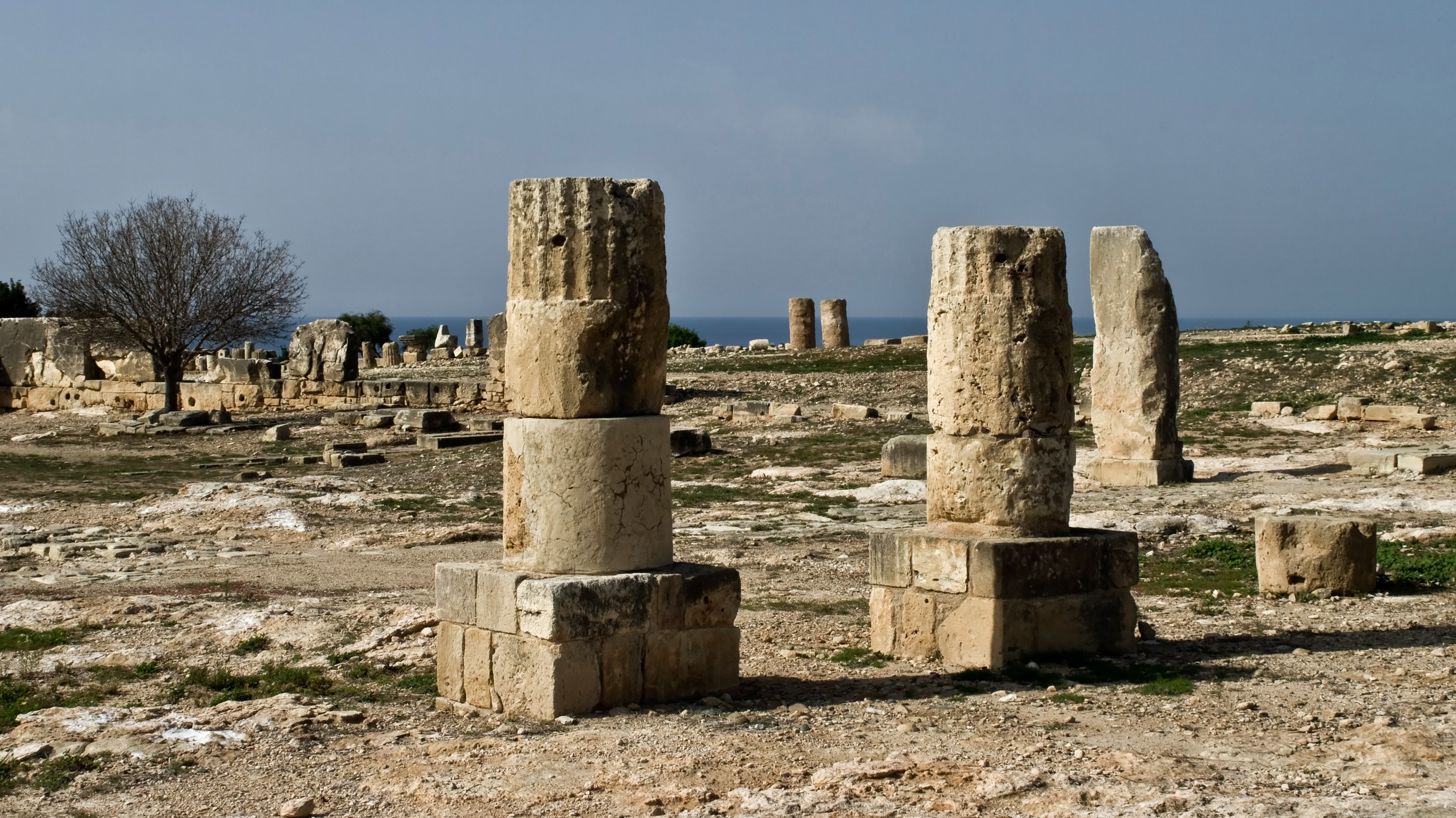
Sanctuary of Aphrodite Paphia

Sanctuary of Aphrodite Paphia

"Astarte coin" showing sacred baetyl stone in the Sanctuary of Aphrodite Paphia

== Sources ==
Averett, Erin Walcek (2013). "Review of Weihgeschenke aus dem Heiligtum der Aphrodite in Alt-Paphos: Terrakotten, Skulpturen und andere figürliche Kleinvotive, by Danielle Leibundgut Wieland and Lore Frey-Asche". American Journal of Archaeology.

Boedeker, Deborah D. (1974). Aphrodite's Entry into Greek Epic. Leiden: Brill. ISBN 978-90-04-03946-9.

De Graauw, Arthur. "Silting up". Ancient Ports - Ports Antiques.

Georgiadou, Anna (2019). "La dimension régionale des échanges entre Chypre et le Levant à l'époque chypro-géométrique (XIe-VIIIe s. av. J.-C.)". In Driessen, Jan (ed.). Les royaumes de Chypre à l'épreuve de l'histoire: La dimension régionale des échanges entre Chypre et le Levant à l'époque chypro-géométrique et autres études. Suppléments du BCH. Vol. 1. École française d'Athènes. pp. 49–65. doi:10.4000/books.efa.2936. ISBN 978-2-86958-522-5.

Halczuk, Agnieszka. "Paphians outside Paphos. Inscriptions in the Paphian Syllabary found outside Cyprus". CyCoMed: Cypriot Coinage in the Mediterranean. Institute of Historical Research, National Hellenic Research Foundation.

Iacovou, Maria (2018). "From the Late Cypriot Polities to the Iron Age "Kingdoms": Understanding the Political Landscape of Cyprus from Within". In Cannavò, Anna; Thély, Ludovic (eds.). Les royaumes de Chypre à l'épreuve de l'histoire: Transitions et ruptures de la fin de l'âge du Bronze au début de l'époque hellénistique [The Kingdoms of Cyprus Tested by History: Transitions and Ruptures from the End of the Bronze Age to the Beginning of the Hellenistic Period]. Bulletin de Correspondance Hellénique Suppléments (in French). Vol. 60. Athens: École française d'Athènes. doi:10.4000/books.efa.2901. ISBN 978-2-86958-307-8.

Iacovou, Maria (2019). "Palaepaphos: Unlocking the Landscape Context of the Sanctuary of the Cypriot Goddess". Open Archaeology. 5 (1): 204–234. doi:10.1515/opar-2019-0015.

Jasink, Anna Margherita (2010). "The Role of Cyprus and the Mycenaean / Greek Presence in the Island from the End of Bronze Age to the First Phases of Iron Age" (PDF). Studi Micenei ed Egeo-Anatolici. 52: 153–178.

"Medieval Kouklia: A Centre of Cane Sugar Production (Site TST)". University of Zurich.

"Palaipafos (Kouklia)". Department of Antiquities, Republic of Cyprus (in Greek).

"Paphos". UNESCO World Heritage Centre.

Pestarino, Beatrice (2023). "Review of: Maria Christidis, Antoine Hermary, Gabriele Koiner, Anja Ulbrich, Classical Cyprus: proceedings of the Conference, University of Graz, 21-23 September 2017. Kypriaka, 5. Wien: Verlag Holzhausen, 2020. Pp. 497. ISBN 9783903207462". Bryn Mawr Classical Review.

Pestarino, Beatrice (2024). "An Eteocypriot-Greek bilingual inscription and the meaning of Cypriot eupatridai". Kadmos. 63 (1/2): 19–38. doi:10.1515/kadmos-2024-0002.

Radner, Karen (2025). "The many kingdoms of Cyprus". Assyrian Empire Builders. University College London.

Raptou, Eustathios (2018). "The city and its necropolises: a contribution to the topography of Palaepaphos" [La ville et ses nécropoles : contribution à la topographie de Palaepaphos]. In Cannavò, Anna; Thély, Ludovic (eds.). The Kingdoms of Cyprus Tested by History [Les royaumes de Chypre à l'épreuve de l'histoire] (in French). French School at Athens. pp. 89–110. doi:10.4000/books.efa.2901.

Stillwell, Richard; MacDonald, William L.; McAllister, Marian Holland, eds. (1976). "PAPHOS or Palaipaphos (Kouklia) Cyprus". The Princeton Encyclopedia of Classical Sites. Princeton, NJ: Princeton University Press.

Voskarides, K.; Mazières, S.; Hadjipanagi, D.; Di Cristofaro, J.; Ignatiadou, A.; Stefanou, C.; El-Sibai, M.; Koupparis, G.; Loutsiou, A.; Giannakeas, T.; Michailidou, K.; Chiaroni; Deltas, C. (2016). "Y-chromosome phylogeographic analysis of the Greek-Cypriot population reveals elements consistent with Neolithic and Bronze Age settlements". Investigative Genetics. 7 (1): 1. doi:10.1186/s13323-016-0032-8. PMC 4750176. PMID 26870315.

"Μνημεία Παγκόσμιας Κληρονομιάς – Πάφος" [World Heritage Monuments – Paphos]. Τμήμα Αρχαιοτήτων - Υφυπουργείο Πολιτισμού (in Greek). Department of Antiquities, Republic of Cyprus.
