= Souskiou =

Souskiou Σουσκιού Susuz
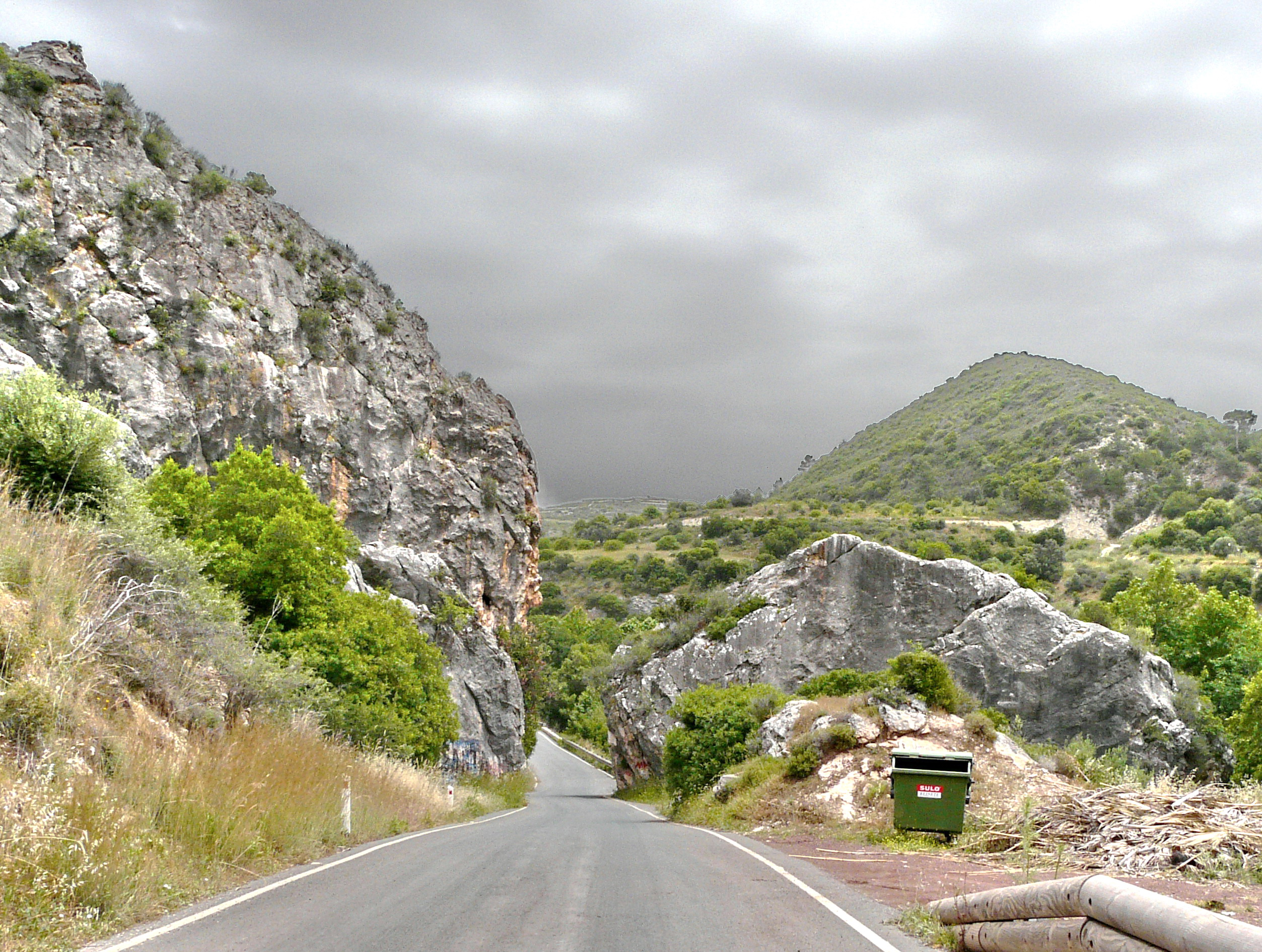

- Location in Cyprus
- Coordinates: 34°43′59″N 32°36′9″E
- Country: Cyprus
- District: Paphos District

Population (2001)
  - Total: 2
- Time zone: UTC+2 (EET)
  - Summer (DST): UTC+3 (EEST)
- Postal code: 6103

Souskiou (Greek: Σουσκιού, Turkish: Susuz) is an abandoned village in the Paphos District of Cyprus, located 4 km north of Kouklia. The village was formerly mixed, but by the 1960s had become entirely Turkish Cypriot. It was abandoned following the 1974 Turkish invasion of Cyprus and the displacement of the Turkish Cypriot population to the Turkish-occupied north of the island.
