= Huwasi stone =

In Hittite mythology, a ritual standing stone

In Hittite mythology, a huwasi (meaning "standing stone") is a ritual standing stone to a deity usually situated in a temple. Huwasi are sometimes identified as examples of baetyls.

Larger huwasi stones were placed in an open area surrounded by trees and other plants. The stones were treated as gods and were given food and water and anointed and washed.

At any cult centre, the deities that could not be given a temple were worshipped at huwasi stones. The term huwasi was used to describe the housing of the sacred stela, the huwasi stone.

Gary Beckman speculated that worship of the huwasi may be related to passages in the Song of Emergence (CTH 344) where the god Ea declares that a stone which Kumarbi bit him while trying to devour his son, the Storm-god, will become an object for which sacrifices and offerings will be made.
