= Baetyl =

Type of sacred standing stone

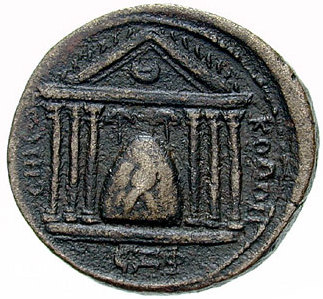
The Emesa temple to the sun god Elagabalus with baetyl at centre. Roman coin of 3rd century AD.

A baetyl (/ˈbiːtɪl/; also betyl), literally "house of god", is a sacred stone (sometimes believed to be a meteorite) that was venerated and thought to house a god or deity. The most famous example is the Omphalos stored in the Temple of Apollo at the Greek town of Delphi.

The term baetyl was used in ancient Near Eastern sources, in the form of beth-el, as well as in Greek and Roman sources, as a baitylos. In the former, the term was used to refer to the names of gods or places. Examples include Bethel, a location described in the Hebrew Bible, and the deity Bethel, who was mentioned in texts like Esarhaddon's Treaty with Ba'al of Tyre and the Elephantine papyri. In the latter, the word was used to describe a round stone that had fallen from the sky (i.e. a meteorite).

The word baetyl has taken on a vague use in modern writing. It has been debated both how ancient and modern usage of this word compare with one another. And, among modern historians, concerns have risen over the precision, accuracy, and generalizing tendency of the usage of this term in describing ancient texts and material objects. The term has been used expansively, referring to any cultic stone regardless of the type or shape of stone that it was, such as whether it was a rounded stone (or ovoid), a pillar, or a stele (standing stone). This generalization has been criticized as not corresponding to ancient use of the term itself and resulting in a projection of the modern sense of the word (a sacred stone containing the presence of a deity) onto a wide variety of cultic stone objects where little evidence exists for such an understanding, as in the case of the Nabataeans.

== Etymology ==
The term baetyl is a derivation of the Greek baetylus/baitylos (βαίτυλος), itself being derived from the Semitic term bytʾl (or "beth-el", "house of god"), where it appears to have referred to open-air sanctuaries.

An equivalent word in the ancient Near Eastern context, sikkānum/skn ("standing stones"), was used in ancient Syrian city states like Mari, Ugarit, and Emar.

== In literature ==
=== Ancient Near East ===
The earliest known evidence for the baetyl concept in the ancient Near East, where it designated either the name of a place or a god, comes from the 8th century BC, from the Sefire steles, a set of three Aramaic stelae discovered at the site of Sfire. In the first half of the 7th century BC, a Phoenician-Aramaic god known as Bethel is first attested.

==== In the Bible ====
The Book of Genesis records a story (28:10–22) concerning the patriarch Jacob. According to the story, Jacob went to sleep after laying his head on a certain rock. It was in this instance that he had the vision known as Jacob's Ladder, which included an appearance of God. When he awoke, Jacob declared that God was in the location he was in. He declared the place to be the "house of God" (and so named it Bethel) and took the stone that he was laying his head on and set it up as a sacred pillar. Though this narrative has been appealed to in some discussions of baetyls, the term Bethel ("House of God") is not used to refer to the stone but to the new name of the town as a whole. Furthermore, the Hebrew word for "pillar", maṣṣebah, was translated into Greek in the Septuagint as oikos theou ("house of god"), and not baitylos, further indicating a lack of connection between this narrative and the baetyl concept. The stone itself is also not the actual location of God's presence, but is a memorial for the vision and vow. Its sacred status is a result of its status as Jacob's pillar.

=== Ancient Greece ===
The first Greek usage of the baitylos comes from a first-century text, but only as the name of a slave, not as a stone or a god. The next usage comes from the same century, in the Phoenician History by Philo of Byblos, where it refers to the name of one of the sons of Ouranos and Gaia. Philo then refers to a magical stone he calls a baitylia, which was invented when Ouranos first rained them from heaven (making it a meteorite; this is a common mythological etiology for the origins of these sacred stones). Philo's discussion is only extant in quotations from Eusebius, who lived in the fourth century. Another first-century reference is from Pliny the Elder, who describes the baitylos in the following manner:

Sotacus distinguishes also two other varieties of the stone, a black and a red, resembling axe-heads. According to him, those among them that are black and round are supernatural objects; and he states that thanks to them cities and fleets are attached and overcome, their name being baetuli while the elongated stones are cerauniae.

A much later reference occurs in the works of Damascius, a 6th-century Neoplatonist, according to later quotations of his text by Photios I of Constantinople in his Bibliotheca. There, it is a spherical stone that originated from the sky and was discovered by a certain man named Eusebius. Eusebius finds that this stone is prophetic and becomes its interpreter.

=== Ancient Rome ===
It is only in the Later Roman Empire and in the period of late antiquity when the term baitylos came to take on connotations that combined its connotations of divinity from the Semitic tradition with the connotations of its function as an object in the Greek tradition. This fusion was a product of the dual influence of both Semitic and Greek tradition on the Roman Near East, particularly in northern Syria and Lebanon.

== In material sources ==
=== Ancient Near East ===
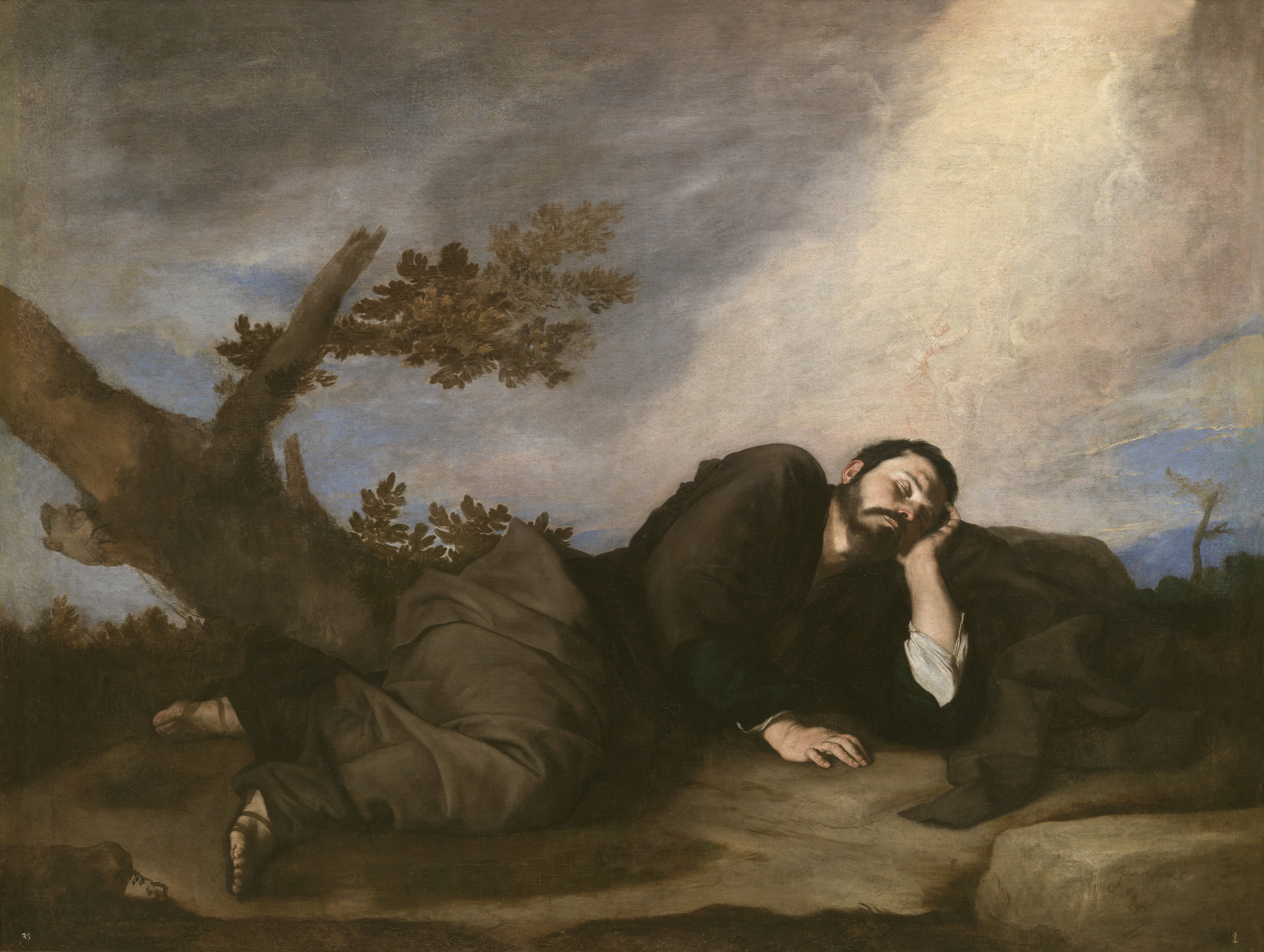
Depiction of Jacob's dream sleeping on a stone at Bethel, by José de Ribera

In the study of the ancient Near East, the term 'baetyl' is usually broadly used to describe cultic stones. Evidence for such cultic stones comes from the Neolithic temple site of Tas-Silġ, texts from the Amorite site Mari where the term sikkanum designated a stone used in cultic ceremony, the huwasi stones installed into the temples and open-air sanctuaries of the Hittites, and among the Phoenicians. In studies of Phoenicia and Punic religion, the term baetyl is typically used to refer to a fairly small object that is ovoid or conical. Some early stelae from Phoenicia inscribe ovoid-shaped objects, which may prefigure the later appearance of actual baetyls. In Phoenician theogony as described by Philo of Byblos, there was a god named Baitylos, who was one of the four sons of Ouranos.

The Meccan sanctuary, the Kaaba, has been referred to in pre-Islamic Arabic poetry as "God's house" (bayt allāh). According to later sources, the Black Stone (a baetyl) was moved to this location from a nearby mountaintop in order to augment the sacred nature of the site when the area was under control of the Quraysh. Such baetyls can be described with the Arabic nuṣub (pl. anṣāb), typically referring to sacrificial stone altars (mentioned several times in the Quran: 5:3, 90; 70:43) which is distinct from terms like ṣanam and watham, which refer to manufactured statues. Some historians have compared the Black Stone to the description of a black, rounded stone said to have descended from heaven as described by Herodian.

=== Ancient Greece and Rome ===
In ancient Greek religion and mythology, the term was specially applied to the Omphalos of Delphi ("navel"), the stone supposed to have been swallowed by Cronus (who feared misfortune from his own children) in mistake for his infant son Zeus, for whom it had been substituted by Gaea. This stone was carefully preserved at Delphi, anointed with oil every day and on festive occasions covered with raw wool.

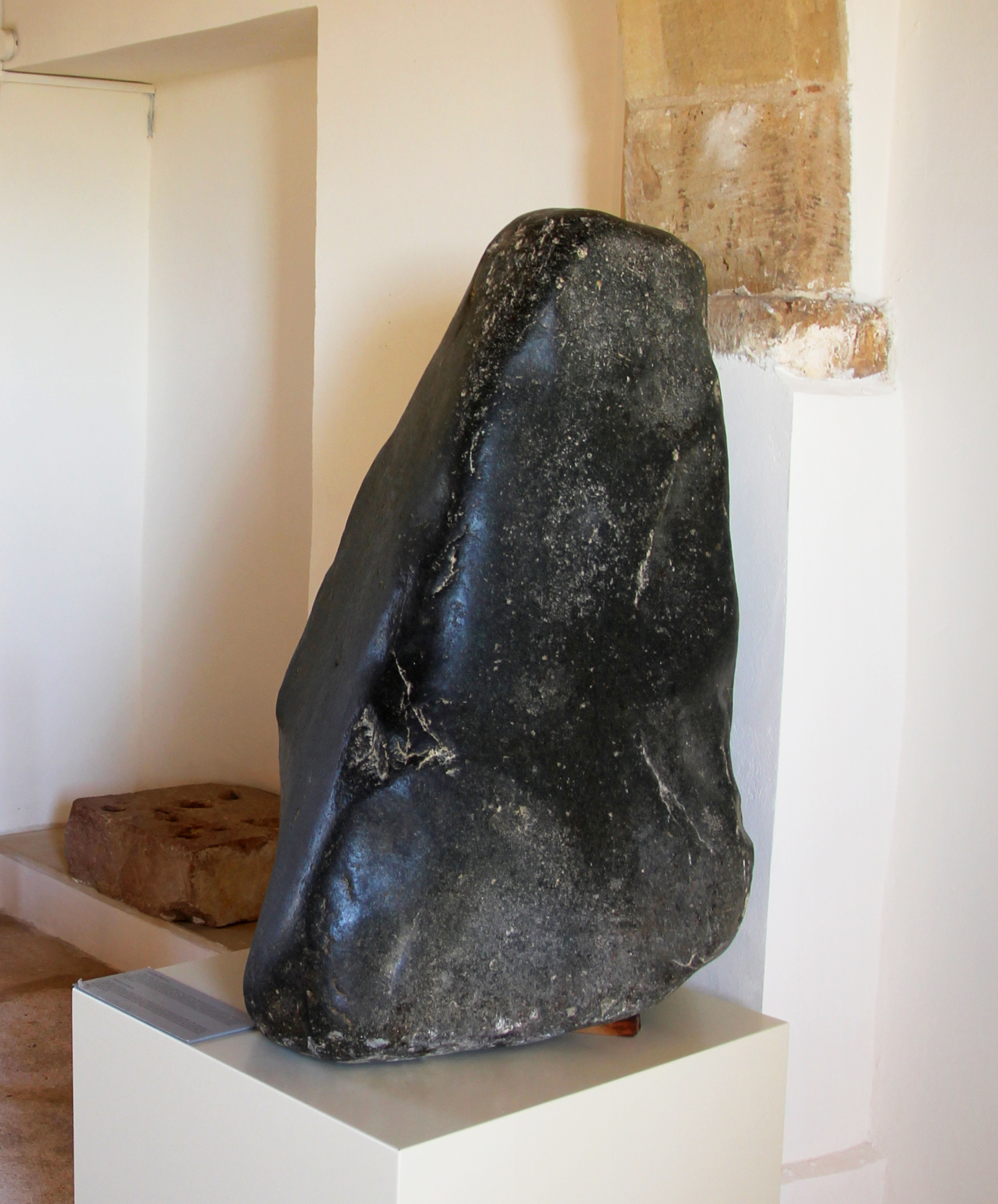
The baetyl of Aphrodite at Palaepaphos, described by Tacitus.

In Rome, there was the stone effigy of Cybele, called Mater Idaea Deum, that had been ceremoniously brought from Pessinus in Asia Minor in 204 BC. The emperor Elagabalus who reigned from 218 until 222 (and was probably a teenager for all his reign) came from Syria and was already the hereditary high priest of the cult of the god Elagabalus there. Once made emperor he brought the god's baetyl to Rome with great ceremony, and built the Elagabalium to house it. It seems to have been a conical meteorite.

According to Tacitus, the simulacrum of the goddess at the Sanctuary of Aphrodite Paphia at her mythological birthplace at Palaepaphos on Cyprus was a rounded object, approximately conical or shaped like a meta (a turning post on a Roman circus) but "the reason for this" he noted, "is obscure".

Other famous baetylic stones were those in the temples of Zeus Casius at Seleucia Pieria, and of Zeus Teleios at Tegea. Even in the declining years of paganism, these cultic symbols retained their significance, as is shown by the attacks upon them by ecclesiastical writers.

=== Pre-Islamic Arabia ===
The nouns nṣb, mnṣb, mṣb, and mnṣbt were used in Safaitic and Nabataean inscriptions, and in pre-Islamic Arabic poetry, to refer to a "cult stone". A corresponding verb was used to mean, "to set up a cult stone". The pre-Islamic Arabian use of practice of using sacrificial stones among pre-Islamic Arabs is also mentioned, retrospectively, in Islamic literature, including the Quran and Hisham ibn al-Kalbi in his Book of Idols. The Quran also uses other verbs, like aṣnām and awthān, to refer to objects of veneration, usually in the context of the idolatry that Abraham faced during his own life.

== See also ==
- Asherah pole, Canaanite sacred tree or pole honouring Asherah, consort of El
- Bema and bimah, elevated platform
- Benben
- Ceremonial pole
- High place, raised place of worship
- Huaca, cult objects in ancient Andes.
- List of Greek deities
- Hajar al-Aswad, a meteoritic stone housed in the Kaaba of Mecca
- Kami, central objects of worship in Shinto, some of which are natural phenomena and objects including stones
- Kanrodai, sacred pillar in Japanese religions
- Lingam, an abstract representation of the Hindu deity Shiva
  - Banalinga, stones naturally worn to ovoid shapes on riverbeds in India
- Matzevah
- Menhir
- Pole worship
- Shaligram, sacred riverbed fossils in India
- Turbah, small clay or earthen slabs used by Twelver Shi’a Muslims
- Xoanon, wooden effigies in Ancient Greek religious use
