= Ten city-kingdoms of Cyprus =

Autonomous monarchical city-states of ancient Cyprus

Ten city-kingdoms of Cyprus Δέκα πόλεις-βασίλεια της Κύπρου (Greek)
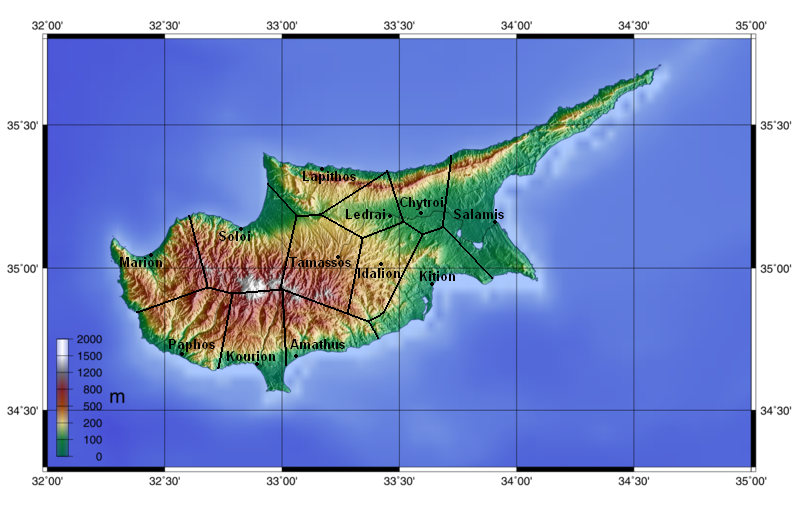
- Ethnic groups: Greeks, Phoenicians, other Cypriot populations
- Today part of: Cyprus

The "ten city-kingdoms of Cyprus" is a traditional term for the autonomous polities run by basileis on the island of Cyprus in the Iron Age. The term, derived from a 673–672 BC tribute list of the Neo-Assyrian king Esarhaddon, is doubly imprecise by standards of modern scholarship. The actual number of polities fluctuated over time until their final dissolution under the Ptolemies in the late 4th century BC, and the designation "city-kingdom" has been called into question in favor of the conventional terms "city-states" or "poleis". Historical sources and modern scholarship identify additional autonomous Cypriot centers including Amathus and Lapathus, with twelve such polities being a widely accepted count. The "city-kingdom" polities were largely autonomous, with alternating periods of Phoenician influence and Assyrian client-king status. Their sovereign structures collapsed during the Wars of the Diadochi (322–272 BC) and were finally dissolved under Ptolemaic administration in the early 3rd century BC.

== The cities in Assyrian records ==
Knowledge about the political organization of these city-kingdoms comes mainly from Assyrian records. A stele attributed to Sargon II erected at Kition in c. 707 BC mentions the subjugation of seven kings of Cyprus ("Ya").

=== Esarhaddon's list ===
The names of ten of the "city-kingdoms" of Cyprus ("Yatnana") are listed in a 673–672 BC inscription found in Nineveh and attributed to Esarhaddon, who ruled the Neo-Assyrian Empire from 681 to 669. Most of these can readily be identified with known locales and include nearly all of the most important Cypriot cities in historical times. Esarhaddon recorded the polity names alongside their respective rulers:

1. Idalion (Edi'il), ruled by Akestor (Ekištūra)
2. Chytri (Kitrusi), ruled by Philagoras (Pilagurâ)
3. Salamis (Sillu'ua), ruled by Kīsu
4. Paphos (Pappa), ruled by Etewandros (Itūandar)
5. Soli (Silli), ruled by Erēsu
6. Kourion (Kuri), ruled by Damasos (Damāsu)
7. Tamassos (Tamesi), ruled by Admetos (Admēsu)
8. Qarti-hadasti ("New Town" / Kition), ruled by Damysos (Damūsi)
9. Ledra (Lidir), ruled by Onasagoras (Unasagusu)
10. Marion (Nuria), ruled by Buthytes (Buṣusu)

Seven of these ten client rulers bore Greek names: Akestor; Philagoras; Etewandros; Damasos; Admetos; Onasagoras; and Buthytes. The remaining three were West Semitic or Phoenician. Esarhaddon's list omits the contemporary polities of Amathus and Lapathus.

== History ==
=== Origins ===
The "city-kingdom" system has its roots in the transition from the Middle (1900–1600 BC) to the Late Bronze Age (1600–1200 BC) in Cyprus. During this transitional era, prehistoric communities grew into a protohistoric and literate civilization, establishing conditions for the island's later urban development and social stratification.

Cyprus possessed vast reserves of copper, a metal essential to producing bronze—and which likely derived its name from that of the island (Note: The name of the metal derives from the Latin aes cyprium meaning 'metal of Cyprus', which became cuprum in Late Latinand coper in Old English; copper is first attested in the 12th century.)—that made it a focal point of Eastern Mediterranean geopolitics. Regional empires and local Cypriot polities competed continuously for control of the island's copper supply in the Bronze Age and into the Iron Age. The major island polity Alashiya maintained an international maritime trade network which specialized in the export of copper. The system of local polities would lay the groundwork for the emergence of more organized city-states or "city-kingdoms" in the later Bronze Age.

=== The poleis ===
These distinct monarchical polities or poleis were led by local dynasties whose socio-political and religious administrations were heavily interconnected, as demonstrated by palace archives which recorded the allocation of funds for upkeep of local sanctuaries and cult centers. Local dynasties would appropriate or construct these sanctuary complexes to make them visual markers of the dynasty's authority and territorial control.

In the 9th century BC, the Phoenician city-state of Tyre established a permanent colony at Kition to manage the island's copper exports, and by the second half of the 8th century BC made vassal states of other Cypriot polities. From Kition, the Phoenicians exerted commercial and cultural influence over inland and northern polities such as Idalion, Tamassos, and Lapathus, and shaped regional burial architecture, official administrative languages, and religious cults.

The ancient "city-kingdoms" of Cyprus.

=== Foreign influence ===
Foreign imperial powers held influence in Cyprus through the Cypro-Archaic and Cypro-Classical periods. Sargon II of Assyria intervened on behalf of Tyre in 709 or 708 BC to suppress a rebellion by Cypriot rulers, which prompted a direct Cypriot diplomatic delegation to Babylon seeking aid. The Assyrian Empire continued to exact tribute from the island polities from 707 to 612. Neo-Assyrian kings Esarhaddon (r. 680–669) and Ashurbanipal (r. 669–631) transformed its indirect ties to the island's city-states into a direct client-king relationship; the term "ten city-kingdoms" itself originated with an inscription attributed to Esarhaddon. Under this client state system, Cypriot city-states including Paphos, Salamis, Idalion, and Kourion provided material tribute and military support to the Assyrian crown.

Egypt took possession of Cyprus from 570 to 525 BC. The Achaemenid Persian Empire then took control of the island from 525 until 333 BC. In 499–498 BC, several Cypriot city-kingdoms joined the Ionian Revolt against Persian imperial rule. The Persians responded in force to quash the revolt and regain control of the whole of Cyprus.

The city-kingdoms, while in successive Assyrian, Egyptian, and Persian spheres of influence, generally prospered as centers of wealth and culture during the Cypro-Archaic and Cypro-Classical periods. They retained substantial autonomy; by the late 6th century BC, many began to mint their own coinage. The material culture, art, and iconography of city-kingdoms across the island during this time show minimal Near Eastern and Levantine characteristics and became more integrated with Ancient Greek art.

In the Classical period, smaller inland city-kingdoms including Idalion and Tamassos became dependent on larger maritime polities such as Paphos for access to foreign trading ports.

=== Decline ===
Alexander the Great took control of Cyprus in 333 BC, ending nearly two centuries of Achaemenid Persian rule. Following Alexander's death in 323 BC, power struggles among his successors (the Diadochi) disrupted the island's political landscape and culminated in the dissolution of the long-standing system of autonomous "city-kingdoms". Between roughly 294 and 258 BC, the Ptolemaic Kingdom dissolved the city-kingdoms along with their local ruling dynasties to unify Cyprus under a centralized Hellenistic administration.

Evidence from inscriptions at Amathus and at Kafizin hill near Idalion indicate a protracted integration of local nobility into the new Ptolemaic state rather than a smooth transition. Local elites who resisted assimilation into the new administration adopted the Greek title eupatridēs to safeguard their status.

=== After the "city-kingdoms" ===
Ptolemaic authorities governed the island from Alexandria through Salamis and then through Nea Paphos. The Roman Republic annexed Cyprus in 58 BC. Cyprus became a formal Roman province in 22 BC, with Nea Paphos serving as the provincial capital and official residence of the Roman governor. Nea Paphos remained the capital until the administrative reorganization of the island in 330 AD.

== Mythological foundations ==
The origin myths of many Cypriot city-kingdoms were closely tied to epic traditions surrounding the aftermath of the legendary Trojan War. According to these traditional accounts, Greek heroes wandered from Troy to Cyprus, where they founded settlements which became the city-kingdoms.

Archaeological findings suggest that these myths may reflect the basic outlines of Late Bronze Age settlement patterns on Cyprus. Salamis and Kourion, for example, supplanted the major sites Enkomi and (possibly) Episkopi Bamboula around the end of the 11th century BC. Other prominent Iron Age cities including Idalion, Soloi, and Amathus originated during this transitional period. An obelos from Palaepaphos bearing an 11th-century BC Greek personal name in syllabic script further corroborates a Greek presence on Cyprus in the Late Bronze Age.

== Evolution of material culture ==
The city-states of Cyprus underwent an evolution in material culture from c. 750 to 310 BC, an era comprising the Cypro-Archaic through the Cypro-Classical periods, that paralleled their changing political situation, shifting from an indigenous blend of Near Eastern and Greek craft traditions to standardized Hellenistic and Roman Mediterranean styles. Cypriot pottery designs of this era incorporated Near Eastern traditions alongside imported Greek wares and Phoenician wine jugs. Red and black-painted ceramics known as Cypriot Bichrome ware became widespread across the island following its introduction from the Near East. Ceramic ornamentation transitioned from earlier rectilinear schemes toward circular, floral, and figurative motifs. Distinct regional production centers also emerged, exemplified by white ware vessels from the Amathus area painted with aquatic bird motifs.

== Cartographic attestations ==
In addition to written attestations, the Cypriot polities and ancient Cypriot toponyms are attested in maps produced from the Roman period through the modern era. Maps following the tradition of the Geographia of Claudius Ptolemy were consistent in naming and locating the island's principal first-millennium BC urban centers.

Natale Bonifacio, 1570, "Cyprus Insula".

In the early modern period, these ancient maps became widely known as engravings published in printed atlases. British military surveys of Cyprus in the 19th century incorporated ancient place-names into modern land and sea maps.

== See also ==
- Timeline of Cypriot history

== Sources ==
- Buitron-Oliver, Diana; Herscher, Ellen (1997). "Introduction: The City-Kingdoms of Early Iron Age Cyprus". Bulletin of the American Schools of Oriental Research. 308: 1–3. doi:10.1086/BASOR1357404.
- "Cypro-Archaic and Cypro-Classical Periods 1, 750 to 310 BC". National Museum of Ireland.
- "Hellenistic and Roman Periods, 310 BC to 330 AD". National Museum of Ireland.
- Iacovou, Maria (2018). "From the Late Cypriot Polities to the Iron Age "Kingdoms": Understanding the Political Landscape of Cyprus from Within". In Cannavò, Anna; Thély, Ludovic (eds.). Les royaumes de Chypre à l'épreuve de l'histoire: Transitions et ruptures de la fin de l'âge du Bronze au début de l'époque hellénistique [The Kingdoms of Cyprus Tested by History: Transitions and Ruptures from the End of the Bronze Age to the Beginning of the Hellenistic Period]. Bulletin de Correspondance Hellénique Suppléments (in French). Vol. 60. Athens: École française d'Athènes. doi:10.4000/books.efa.2901. ISBN 978-2-86958-307-8.
- Mitford, T. B. (1950). "Kafizin and the Cypriot Syllabary". The Classical Quarterly. 44 (3/4): 97–106. JSTOR 637337.
- Novotny, Jamie R.; Erich Fox Grubbs. "Esarhaddon 001 (Q003230)". The Royal Inscriptions of the Neo-Assyrian Period (RINAP). Open Richly Annotated Cuneiform Corpus (Oracc).
- Pestarino, Beatrice (2023). "Review of: Maria Christidis, Antoine Hermary, Gabriele Koiner, Anja Ulbrich, Classical Cyprus: proceedings of the Conference, University of Graz, 21-23 September 2017. Kypriaka, 5. Wien: Verlag Holzhausen, 2020. ISBN 9783903207462". Bryn Mawr Classical Review.
- Pestarino, Beatrice (2024). "An Eteocypriot-Greek bilingual inscription and the meaning of Cypriot eupatridai". Kadmos. 63 (1/2): 19–38. doi:10.1515/kadmos-2024-0002.
- Radner, Karen (2025). "The many kingdoms of Cyprus". Assyrian Empire Builders. University College London.
- Satraki, Anna (November 2013). "The Iconography of Basileis in Archaic and Classical Cyprus: Manifestations of Royal Power in the Visual Record". Bulletin of the American Schools of Oriental Research (370): 123–144. doi:10.5615/bullamerschoorie.370.0123.
- Stillwell, Richard; MacDonald, William L.; McAllister, Marian Holland, eds. (1976). "PAPHOS or Palaipaphos (Kouklia) Cyprus". The Princeton Encyclopedia of Classical Sites. Princeton, NJ: Princeton University Press.
- Zournatzi, Antigoni (7 January 2011). "CYPRUS in the Achaemenid Period". Encyclopædia Iranica. doi:10.1163/2330-4804_EIRO_COM_10773.
