= Kouklia =

Kouklia Κούκλια
- Village
- Location in Cyprus
- Coordinates: 34.707352°N 32.573355°E
- Country: Cyprus
- District: Paphos District

Government
  - Mayor: Michael S. Solonos

Population (2001)
  - Total: 669
- Time zone: UTC+2 (EET)
  - Summer (DST): UTC+3 (EEST)
- Postcode: 8500
- Website: www.Kouklia.org.cy

UNESCO World Heritage Site
- Official name: Paphos
- Criteria: Cultural: iii, vi
- Reference: 79
- Inscription: 1980 (4th Session)
- Area: 162.0171 ha (400.353 acres)

Saint Apostle Luke Orthodox Church in Kouklia, 2021

Kouklia (Greek: Κούκλια, Turkish: Kukla) is a village on the southern coast of Cyprus. It is in the Paphos District, about 16 kilometres (9.9 mi) east of the city of Paphos. The village is near the site of the ancient city of Palaepaphos (Old Paphos) (Greek: Παλαίπαφος), capital of the Cypriot city-state of Paphos, and the ruins of the Sanctuary of Aphrodite Paphia.

UNESCO inscribed the ruins of the ancient city-state of Paphos as a World Heritage Site in 1980. It is a serial property consisting of three components: Palaepaphos in Kouklia; Nea Paphos; and the Tombs of the Kings near Nea Paphos. Much of ancient Palaepaphos is under archaeological excavation, managed by the Cyprus Department of Antiquities.

== Name ==
Local tradition traces the village's name to the Byzantine period, derived from the term kouvikoularios, an imperial official. The name may be derived from Greek kivourka or kouvoklia, meaning “tombs” or “entombing places”. Turkish Cypriots called the village Kukla. In the Middle Ages it is was called "Couvouclia".

== Geography ==
Kouklia is on the Mediterranean coast of southwest Cyprus. The village sits near the mouth of the intermittent Diarizos River (Note: The upper river is predominantly perennial, while it is intermittent downstream of the Arminou Dam. In Cyprus, rivers do not maintain a constant flow along their full length. Most rivers flow for three to four months per year and remain dry for the remaining months. Only the upstream sections of six rivers originating in the Troodos Mountains—the Xeros, Diarizos, Kargotis, Marathasas, Kouris, and Germasogeia—maintain a constant flow.) which originates in the Paphos Forest on the Troodos massif to the village's north and flows southward toward the Mediterranean Sea.

Coast of Kouklia, Cyprus.

== History ==
=== Ancient Old Paphos ===
Kouklia is the location of the homonymous seat of the ancient Cypriot city-state of Paphos. It was first permanently settled in the Bronze Age in c. 1700 BC; the original Sanctuary of Aphrodite dates to 1200 BC. Paphos city was an important center of maritime copper trade in the Bronze and Iron Ages. It was ideally located near a natural harbor at the mouths of rivers (Note: As the harbor had silted up by 4th century BC, details—including its possible locations and names—are vague. Historical sources refer to a harbor at Paphos on the mouth of a "Bocarus" river, and some of these same sources equate the Bocarus with the Diarizos. See Iacovou (2019) passim for the current state of research. See also map in Radner (2025): "The political geography of Cyprus in the 8th century BC. From D. W. Rupp, 'Puttin' on the Ritz: Manifestations of High Status in Iron Age Cyprus', in E. Peltenburg (ed.), Early Society in Cyprus, Edinburgh 1989, 347 fig. 38.5.") which provided access to timber and copper in the Troodos Mountains north of the city. The city became known as "Palaepaphos" after Cyprus was incorporated into the Ptolemaic Kingdom in the late 4th century BC, and as "Palaipafos" after the island came under Roman administration in 22 BC.

=== Medieval period ===
Palaepaphos became known as "Couvouclia" in the Middle Ages. In the late 13th century, the Lusignan rulers of the Kingdom of Cyprus (1192–1489) took control of Kouklia as their feudal estate. The Lusignans transformed Kouklia and the Paphos region into a major center for sugarcane cultivation and refining; it would remain so throughout the Lusignan and subsequent Venetian (1489–1571) eras. The Lusignans established sugar plantations across the region and built an industrial sugarcane milling complex at Kouklia, and a manor house which served as the estate's administrative center.

Lusignan Manor House in Kouklia

In the 12th or 13th century, the Church of Panagia Katholiki was built east of the Sanctuary of Aphrodite site, and modified into the early modern period. In the 15th century. Byzantine frescoes and a vaulted cloister were added to the church. In the 16th century, it was expanded into a single-aisled domed church.

Panagia Katholiki, Kouklia.

The Kouklia complex maintained its administrative function into the Ottoman period (1571–1914) as the head of the local chiflik before falling into disuse and partial ruin by the early 20th century.

=== Ottoman period ===
Kouklia had a mixed Greek Cypriot and Turkish Cypriot population under Ottoman Turkish rule. The Ottoman census of 1831 counted 115 males (the standard census measure in the Ottoman Empire) in the village, of which 48 were Turkish Cypriots and 67 were Greek Cypriots.

=== British rule ===
Economic conditions across the Paphos district reached a low point under the British colonial rule which began in 1878. Poverty and food shortages prompted a substantial portion of Kouklia's population to emigrate to the United Kingdom, Australia, South Africa, and the United States.

British archaeologists excavating in Kouklia in the late 19th and mid-20th centuries documented the village's ongoing impoverishment. A photograph from the 1887–1888 Cyprus Exploration Fund excavations shows British archaeologists clearing soil from the ancient sanctuary; behind them, on the terrace of the sanctuary, are the low mud-mortared houses of the village, constructed from ashlar blocks that their inhabitants scavenged from the ruins. A second British team working at Kouklia in 1950 found the village just as destitute as it had been in the late 1880s.

=== Modern Cyprus ===
Kouklia maintained a mixed population of Greek and Turkish Cypriots through the country's independence in 1960 and up to the Turkish invasion of Cyprus in 1974. Neither the island-wide displacements of the 1950s anti-colonial emergency nor the intercommunal violence of 1960s affected Kouklia's demographics; the village's Turkish sector provided shelter to displaced Turkish Cypriots. A 1960 census showed that Greek Cypriots represented 60 percent of the village's population.

In July 1974, during the Turkish military offensive in the north, Greek Cypriot forces entered Kouklia's Turkish sector to disarm local militants. The incursion prompted roughly 450 Turkish Cypriots to flee and resettle in the north. An additional 28 Turkish Cypriots evacuated Kouklia under escort of the United Nations Peacekeeping Force in Cyprus that August.

Displaced Greek Cypriots from Northern Cyprus then resettled in Kouklia; since 1974 the village has remained predominantly Greek Cypriot. A 2001 census recorded the village's total population as 669.

== Culture ==
Artifacts from the Sanctuary of Aphrodite Paphia in the Local Archaeological Museum of Palaipafos (Kouklia)

The Local Archaeological Museum of Palaipafos (Kouklia) is housed in the Lusignian Medieval Manor House. The museum's collection includes artifacts recovered from the archaeological site of ancient Palaipafos and its necropoleis, as well as items dating to medieval Cyprus. The Saint Apostle Luke Orthodox Church is a Greek Orthodox church in Kouklia.

Saint Apostle Luke Orthodox Church interior

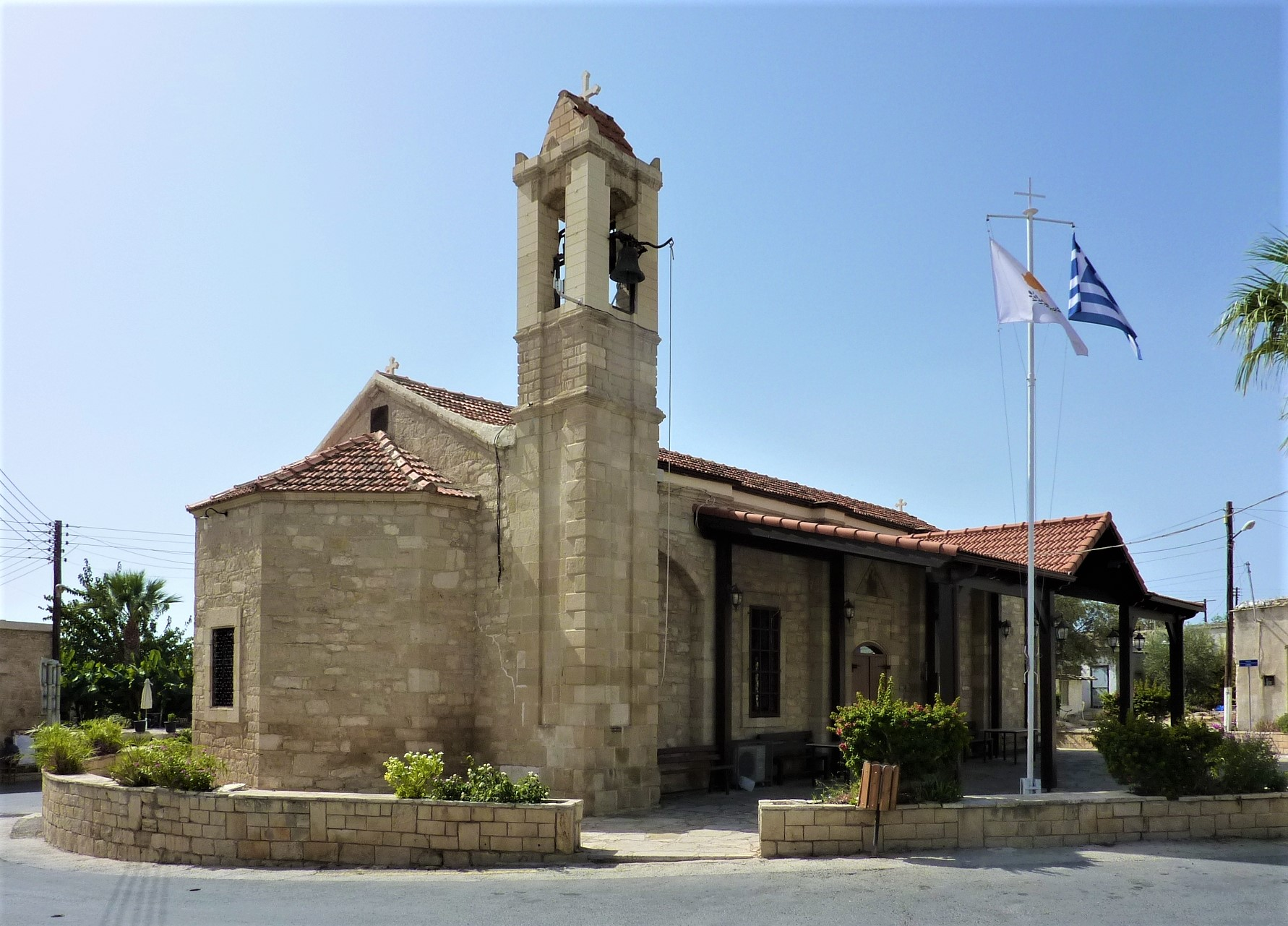
Saint Apostle Luke Orthodox Church, Kouklia
