= Sanctuary of Aphrodite Paphia =

Temple of Aphrodite at Kouklia, Cyprus

UNESCO World Heritage Site
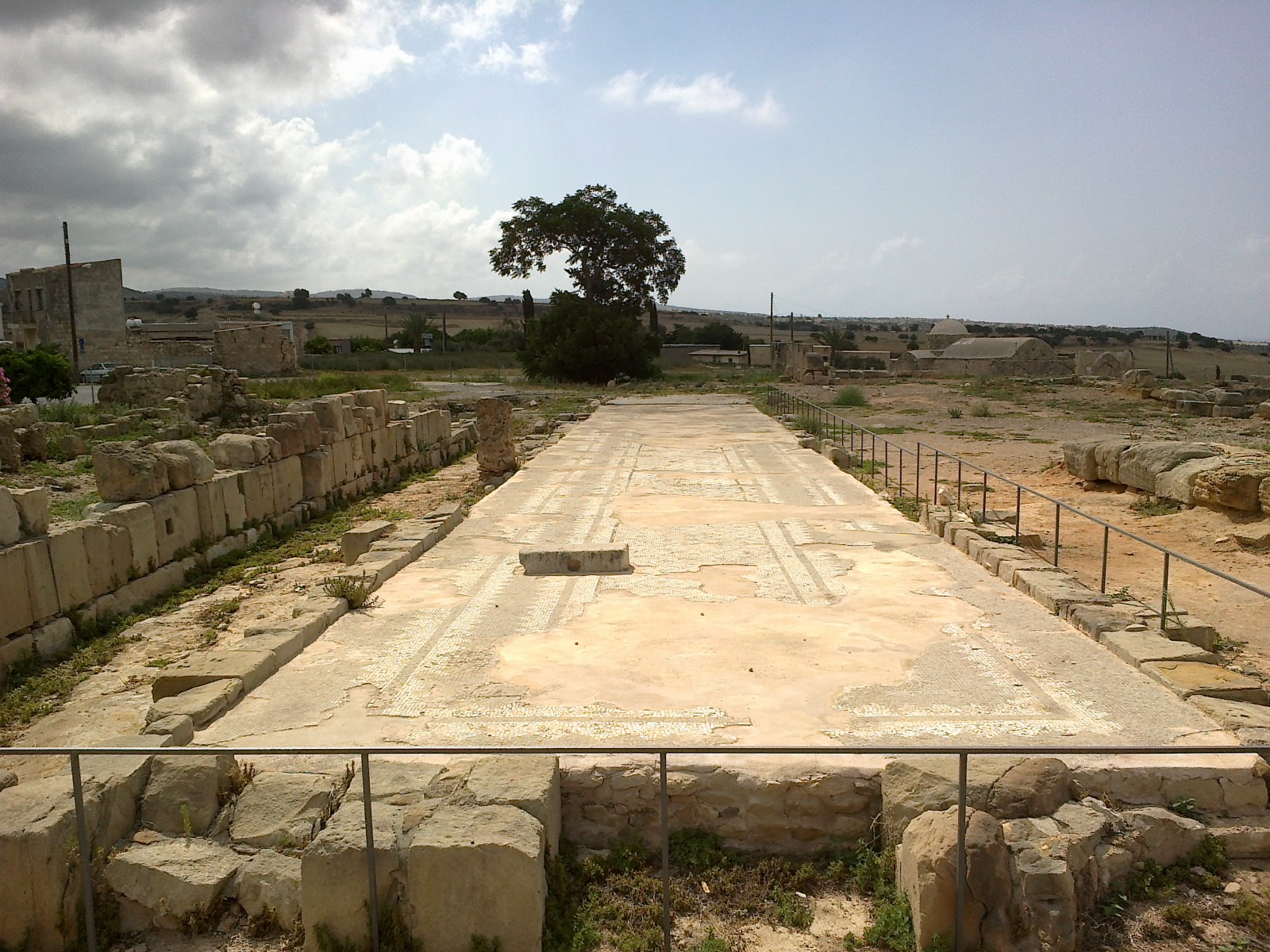
- Sanctuary ruins

- Location within Cyprus
- Official name: Aphrodite's Sanctuary at Kouklia village
- Location: Kouklia, Cyprus
- Part of: Paphos
- Criteria: Cultural: (iii)(vi)
- Reference: 79-003
- Inscription: 1980 (4th Session)
- Area: 32.6883 ha (80.775 acres)
- Coordinates: 34°42′27″N 32°34′27″E

The Sanctuary of Aphrodite Paphia was a sanctuary dedicated to the goddess Aphrodite in ancient Palaepaphos on Cyprus, near the modern village of Kouklia. It was founded in the 12th century BC in the aftermath of the Late Bronze Age collapse. It is located at the mythical birthplace of Aphrodite and in later antiquity was internationally renowned as the principal sanctuary of the cult of Aphrodite. The Sanctuary operated continuously for over fifteen centuries, evolving into a major pan-Mediterranean religious center during the Ptolemaic and Roman periods before its ultimate decline in the late 4th century AD.

The site comprising the entire city of Palaepaphos (Old Paphos) is also referred to as "Kouklia-Palaepaphos" to further differentiate it from the nearby city of Nea Paphos (New Paphos) founded in the 4th century BC; the two were frequently confused by ancient authors.

The archaeological site of the Sanctuary was inscribed as a UNESCO World Heritage Site in 1980 under the name "Aphrodite's Sanctuary at Kouklia village" due to its historical religious significance.

== History ==
Scholarly inquiry into the origins of cultic activity at Kouklia-Palaepaphos relies on architectural remains, epigraphic findings, and classical literary traditions.

The monumental ashlar temenos of the Sanctuary of Aphrodite Paphia at Kouklia-Palaepaphos was constructed c. 1200 BC. It initially functioned as the urban cult center for the city-state of Paphos, whose homonymous seat—later renamed Palaepaphos—had been established 500 years earlier in the Bronze Age, around 1700 BC, as a coastal gateway and maritime trading hub specializing in the export of copper.

The remains of the Bronze Age temenos wall of the Sanctuary of Aphrodite Paphia, 12th century BC.

Coastal transformations and silting deprived Palaepaphos of its harbor some time prior to the 4th century BC, prompting the establishment of Nea Paphos as the polity’s main port. During the Ptolemaic and Roman periods, pilgrims had to approach the Sanctuary of Aphrodite on foot from Nea Paphos or by overland routes in the interior hinterland rather than arrive directly by ship as they had when the harbor was still usable.

== Archaeology ==
=== Early excavations ===
Early archaeological investigations at the Paphos sanctuary began with the British Cyprus Exploration Fund in 1887–1888, followed by fieldwork in 1950 led by Terence B. Mitford. These mid-twentieth-century excavations uncovered Late Bronze Age stratified deposits beneath later Roman and medieval structures, yielding wheelmade Late Cypriot pottery alongside copper slag.

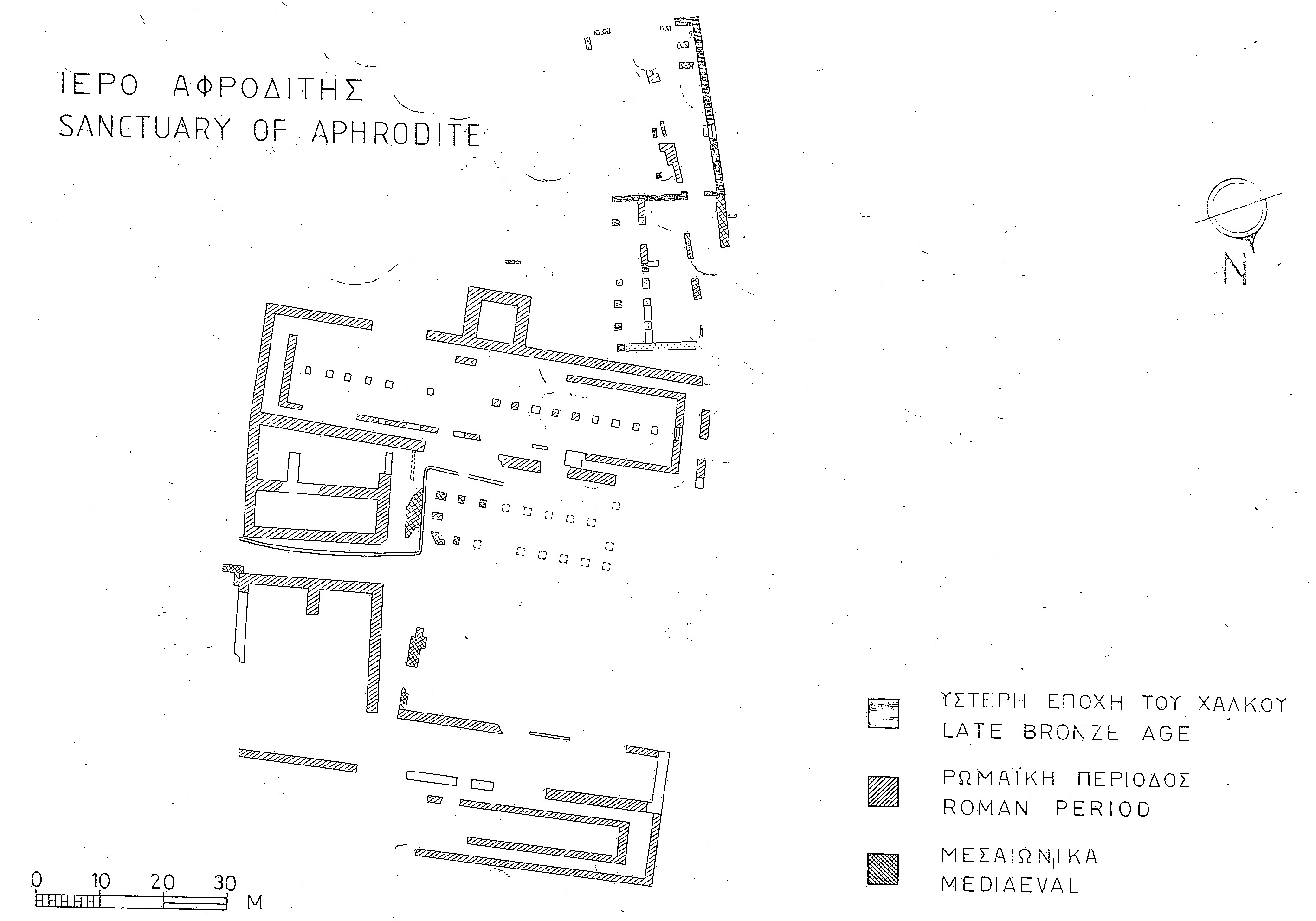
Sanctuary of Aphrodite, Palaepaphos

== Literary references ==
The sanctuary is frequently referred to by ancient writers.

The Homeric Hymns written between 7th-4th centuries BC and spuriously ascribed to Homer in antiquity mention the sanctuary in Hymn 5 to Aphrodite:

She [Aphrodite] went to Kypros, to Paphos, where her precinct is and fragrant altar, and passed into her sweet-smelling temple.

Strabo described it:

Palaipaphos [in Kypros], which last is situated at about ten stadia above the sea, has a mooring-place, and an ancient temple of Aphrodite Paphia. Then [beyond that] to the promontory Zephyria, with a landing-place, and to another Arsinoe, which likewise has a landing-place and a temple and a sacred precinct. And at a little distance from the sea is Hierokepis. Then to Paphos, which was founded by Agapenor, and has both a harbor and well-built temples. It is sixty stadia distant from Palaiphaphos by land; and on this road men together with women, who also assemble here from the other cities, hold an annual procession to Palaipaphos . . . Then [beyond that] to a city Soloi, with a harbor and a river and a temple of Aphrodite and Isis.

Pausanias described the shrine:

After the capture of Troy the storm that overtook the Greeks on their return home carried Agapenor and the Arkadian fleet to Kypros, and so Agapenor became the founder of Paphos, and built the sanctuary of Aphrodite at Palaipaphos (Old Paphos). Up to that time the goddess had been worshipped by the Kyprians in the district called Golgoi.

Tacitus described the altar and aniconic black stone worshipped at the sanctuary as the simulacrum of Venus:

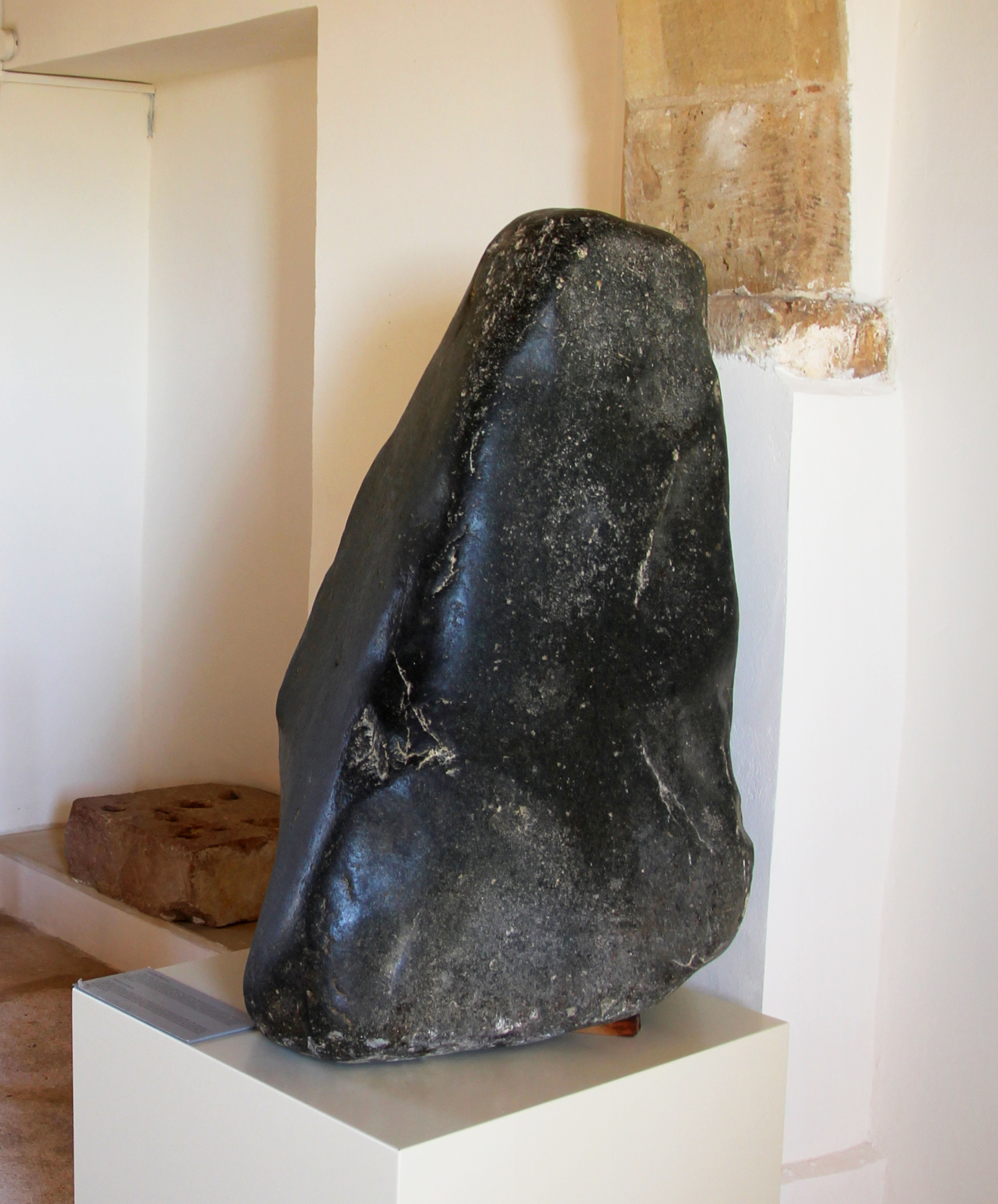
Conical stone which served as the cult idol in the sanctuary of Aphrodite

Blood may not be shed upon the altar, but offering is made only with prayers and pure fire. The altar is never wet by any rain, although it is in the open air. The representation of the goddess is not in human form, but it is a circular mass that is broader at the base and rises like a turning-post to a small circumference at the top. The reason for this is obscure.

It was also referred to by Apuleius in The Golden Ass:

You [Aphrodite] are venerated at the wave-lapped shrine of Paphos.

== Sources ==
Boedeker, Deborah D. (1974). Aphrodite's Entry into Greek Epic. Leiden: Brill. ISBN 978-90-04-03946-9.

Iacovou, Maria (2018). "From the Late Cypriot Polities to the Iron Age "Kingdoms": Understanding the Political Landscape of Cyprus from Within". In Cannavò, Anna; Thély, Ludovic (eds.). Les royaumes de Chypre à l'épreuve de l'histoire: Transitions et ruptures de la fin de l'âge du Bronze au début de l'époque hellénistique [The Kingdoms of Cyprus Tested by History: Transitions and Ruptures from the End of the Bronze Age to the Beginning of the Hellenistic Period]. Bulletin de Correspondance Hellénique Suppléments (in French). Vol. 60. Athens: École française d'Athènes. doi:10.4000/books.efa.2901. ISBN 978-2-86958-307-8.

Iacovou, Maria (2012). "From Regional Gateway to Cypriot Kingdom: Copper Deposits and Copper Routes in the Chora of Paphos". In Kassianidou, Vasiliki; Papasavvas, George (eds.). Eastern Mediterranean Metallurgy and Metalwork in the Second Millennium BC: A Conference in Honour of James D. Muhly, Nicosia, 10th–11th October 2009 (PDF). Oxford: Oxbow Books. pp. 58–69. ISBN 978-1-84217-502-6.

Iacovou, Maria (2019). "Palaepaphos: Unlocking the Landscape Context of the Sanctuary of the Cypriot Goddess". Open Archaeology. 5 (1): 204–234. doi:10.1515/opar-2019-0015.

Jasink, Anna Margherita (2010). "The Role of Cyprus and the Mycenaean / Greek Presence in the Island from the End of Bronze Age to the First Phases of Iron Age" (PDF). Studi Micenei ed Egeo-Anatolici. 52: 149–167.

"Paphos". UNESCO World Heritage Centre.

Pestarino, Beatrice (2023). "Review of: Maria Christidis, Antoine Hermary, Gabriele Koiner, Anja Ulbrich, Classical Cyprus: proceedings of the Conference, University of Graz, 21-23 September 2017. Kypriaka, 5. Wien: Verlag Holzhausen, 2020. Pp. 497. ISBN 9783903207462". Bryn Mawr Classical Review.

Stillwell, Richard; MacDonald, William L.; McAllister, Marian Holland, eds. (1976). "PAPHOS or Palaipaphos (Kouklia) Cyprus". The Princeton Encyclopedia of Classical Sites. Princeton, NJ: Princeton University Press.

"Μνημεία Παγκόσμιας Κληρονομιάς – Πάφος" [World Heritage Monuments – Paphos]. Τμήμα Αρχαιοτήτων - Υφυπουργείο Πολιτισμού (in Greek). Department of Antiquities, Republic of Cyprus.
