= Nicocreon of Cyprus =

4th century BC Cypriot monarch

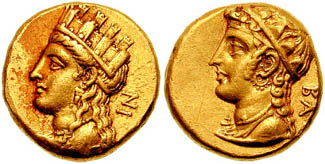
Gold coin (stater) of Nikokreon, following Persian standard. Both sides (left = obverse; right = reverse) depict a draped bust of Aphrodite

Nicocreon (Greek Nικoκρέων; lived 4th century BC) was king of Salamis in Cyprus, at the time of Alexander the Great's (336–323 BC) expedition against Persia.

Nicocreon, along with the other Cypriot kings, submitted to Alexander without opposition. In 331 BC, after the return of Alexander from Egypt, Nicocreon visited the city of Tyre to pay homage to him, where he distinguished himself by the magnificence which he displayed in furnishing his theatrical exhibitions.

After the death of Alexander, Nicocreon allied with Ptolemy against Antigonus, and in 315 BC, he colluded with Seleucus and Menelaus, two of Ptolemy's generals, in neutralizing the Cypriot city-kingdoms which had supported Antigonus. In return for these services, Ptolemy awarded him personal command of Kition, Lapithos, Kyrenia, and Marion, in addition to retaining Salamis. He was also entrusted with the chief command over all of Cyprus.

Nothing is known of the fortunes of Nicocreon after this. As there is no mention of his name during the memorable siege of Salamis by Demetrius Poliorcetes (306 BC), or the great sea-fight that followed it, it seems probable that he died before those events. Some scholars speculate whether the story of the fall of Nicocles and Axiothea of Paphos wasn't a misattributed telling of the downfall of Nicocreon and his house.

One personal anecdote recorded about Nicocreon is his putting the philosopher Anaxarchus to death in a barbarous manner as revenge for an insult which the latter had offered him on the occasion of his visit to Alexander.

Preceded by Pnytagoras	King of Salamis; 331–310 BC	Succeeded by Menelaus
