= Stratonicus =

Stratonicus may refer to:

- Stratonicus of Athens, musician famous for his sharp wit
- Stratonicus (saint), saint of the Eastern Orthodox Church, see September 30 (Eastern Orthodox liturgics)
