= Axiothea of Paphos =

4th century BC Cypriot monarch

Axiothea (Ancient Greek: Ἀξιοθέα) was queen of Paphos, a city-state on the island of Cyprus, in the 4th century BC. She was the wife of Nicocles of Paphos, the last monarch of Paphos.

Ptolemy I Soter besieged Paphos and ordered Nicocles to commit suicide.

== Ancient accounts ==
According to ancient authors, Axiothea killed her own daughters to keep them from their enemies, then joined a group of women in a mass suicide. Diodorus Siculus wrote that the women brought their children to the palace roof to kill them. Polyaenus claimed that the women set fire to the palace and died in the blaze, and that Axiothea killed herself to avoid being burned alive. Diodorus Siculus wrote that the fire was set by Nicocles's male relatives.

The Parian Chronicle suggests that the events described by ancient authors may have actually occurred in Salamis rather than Paphos, and involved Nicocreon of Cyprus rather than Nicocles of Paphos. Athenaeus names an Axiothea as the wife of Nicocreon.

These attributions are debated, and there is no clear consensus among scholars that these events happened in Salamis.
