= Stratonicus of Athens =

4th-century BC musician

Stratonicus (Ancient Greek: Στρατόνικoς; lived 4th century BC), of Athens, was a distinguished musician of the time of Alexander the Great (336–323 BC), of whom scarcely anything is recorded, except the sharp and witty rebuke which he administered to Philotas, when the latter boasted of a victory which he had gained over Timotheus of Miletus. His character is also revealed by another anecdote:

And when he was once asked by some one who were the wickedest people, he said, "That in Pamphylia, the people of Phaselis were the worst; but that the Sidetae were the worst in the whole world." And when he was asked again, according to the account given by Hegesander, which were the greatest barbarians, the Boeotians or the Thessalians he said, "The Eleans."

It is told that Nicocles, king of Cyprus, at the insistence of his wife Axiothea, killed him for some satyric pieces he had composed on Nicocles's sons.
