= Arsinoe (Northwest Cyprus) =

Ancient city in Cyprus

Coordinates: 35°02′06″N 32°25′19″E

Arsinoe (Greek: Ἀρσινόη) was an ancient city in northwestern Cyprus built on top of the older city, Marion (Greek: Μάριον); some ancient writers conflate the two cities.

Ptolemy I Soter destroyed the town of Marion in 312 BCE and removed some inhabitants to Paphos. The city was refounded by Ptolemy II Philadelphus and named after his sister/wife Arsinoe.

According to Strabo there was a grove sacred to Zeus.

Cyprus, from its subjection to the kings of the Ptolemaic dynasty, had more than one city of this name, which was the case with other with several princesses of that dynasty.

The site of Arsinoe is located near modern Polis Chrysochous.
