= Nea Paphos (ancient city) =

Ancient city in southwest Cyprus

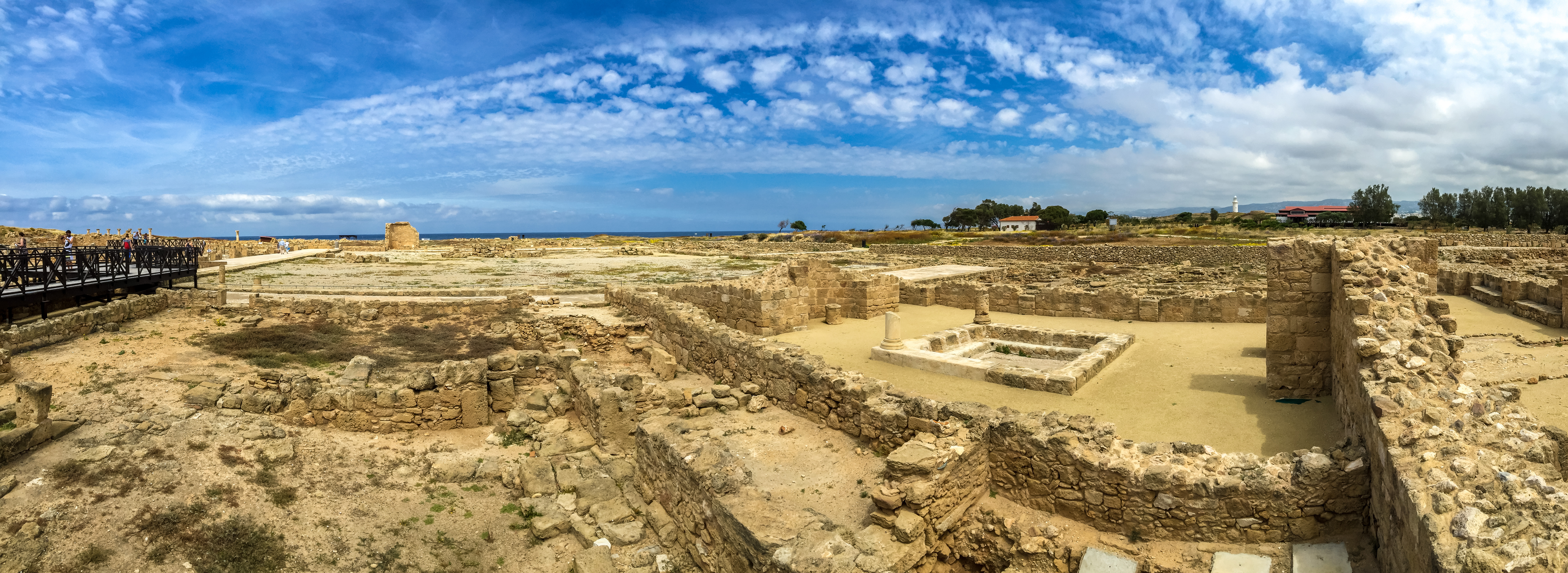
- Paphos panorama, Cyprus.

- Location within Cyprus
- Interactive map of Nea Paphos
- 34.760°N 32.407°E
- Location: Paphos, Cyprus

History
- Built: Established 4th century BC, rebuilt through Byzantine era

Site notes
- Governing body: Cyprus Department of Antiquities

UNESCO World Heritage Site
- Type: Cultural
- Criteria: iii, vi
- Designated: 1980
- Reference no.: https://whc.unesco.org/en/list/79
- Region: Europe

Nea Paphos ("New Paphos") was an ancient city in Cyprus founded in the late 4th century BC. It was built as a successor to Palaepaphos ("Old Paphos") in modern Kouklia, which was the commercial, administrative, and religious center of the Cypriot city-state of Paphos. Nea Paphos was the island's capital under much of its Ptolemaic and Roman administrations, and like its predecessor Palaepaphos became a major maritime trading hub in the eastern Mediterranean. Archaeological excavations at Nea Paphos have uncovered well-preserved urban infrastructure, public buildings, residential compounds, rock-cut tombs, and a harbor complex which date from the city's founding at the start of the Hellenistic era, through Roman rule, and into the island's Byzantine period.

Archaeological excavations at Nea Paphos have uncovered villas with colonnades, atria, wall paintings, and large floor mosaics depicting scenes from classical mythology. Artifacts recovered include large statuary, votive offerings, coinage and minting equipment, and jewelry and other luxury items.

The remains of ancient Nea Paphos (catalogued as "Aphrodite's Sacred City"), the Tombs of the Kings, and the ancient city of Palaepaphos in modern Kouklia comprise the Paphos UNESCO World Heritage Site, which is managed by the Cyprus Department of Antiquities. Nea Paphos comprises much of the neighborhood of Kato Pafos in the modern city of Paphos, and is managed as the Paphos Archaeological Park. Active excavations continue across the park, many areas of which are open to the public as a major island destination.

== History ==
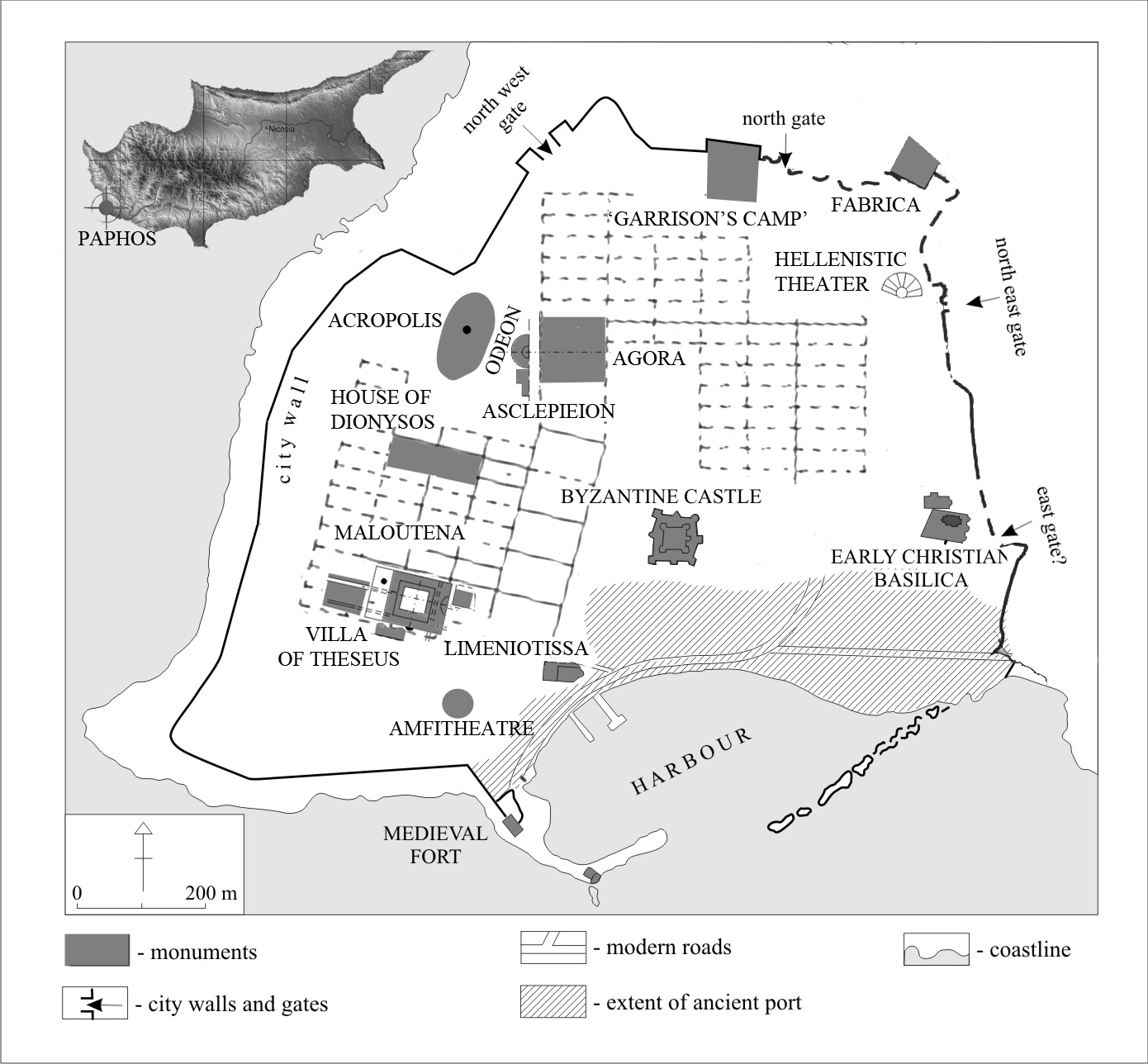
Map of ancient Paphos

Nea Paphos ("New Paphos") was founded in the late 4th century BC by Nicocles (d. 306), the last ruler of the Cypriot polis or "city-kingdom" (Note: The term "ten city-kingdoms" is doubly imprecise by standards of modern scholarship. It derived from a 673–672 BC tribute list of the Neo-Assyrian king Esarhaddon. The actual number of polities fluctuated over time until their final dissolution under the Ptolemies in the late 4th century BC, and the designation "city-kingdom" has been called into question in favor of the more conventional terms "city-state" or "polis".) of Paphos, as a new deep-water port to replace the unusable harbor at Palaepaphos. Paphos, and all of Cyprus, had come under the control of the Ptolemaic Kingdom between the death of Alexander the Great in 323 BC and the conclusion of the wars of his successors in 272; this was a period of complete Hellenization across the island.

Nikokles populated the new settlement in part with residents forcibly removed from the city of Marion by Ptolemy I Soter (r. 305–282). Nea Paphos flourished as a strategic Ptolemaic shipbuilding center and, in the 2nd century BC, became the administrative capital of Cyprus, replacing the city of Salamis. The Roman Republic acquired Cyprus in 58 BC and formally established the province of Roman Cyprus in 22 BC. Nea Paphos would remain the capital through the Hellenistic and Roman eras.

In the 4th century AD, a series of destructive earthquakes resulted in the administrative capital being moved back to Salamis. Nea Paphos was rebuilt as an Early Christian bishopric and survived into the Byzantine era.

== Excavations ==
Archaeological investigations at Nea Paphos were initiated by Polish institutions which continue field operations alongside the Cypriot experts, the Cyprus Department of Antiquities, and other institutions including the University of Sydney. Primary Polish research partners include the Polish Centre of Mediterranean Archaeology University of Warsaw (PCMA UW), the Institute of Archaeology at Jagiellonian University, and the Warsaw University of Technology.

Excavations at Nea Paphos began in June 1965 under Kazimierz Michałowski of the PCMA UW. Initial investigations in the southwestern sector yielded marble statues of the gods Asclepius and Artemis alongside a hoard of silver coins from the reigns of Alexander the Great and Philip III of Macedon. Archaeological investigations of the site expanded in the late 1970s through the Department of Antiquities of Cyprus. Kyriakos Nicolaou first excavated the agora between 1975 and 1978, while Sophocles Hadjisavvas initiated further excavations in Paphos in 1977.

Later teams gradually exposed an expansive ancient residence measuring 120 m (390 ft) long by 80 m (260 ft) wide, naming it the "Villa of Theseus" after a floor mosaic depicting Theseus battling the Minotaur. In 1983, archaeologists uncovered a mosaic depicting the deity Aion and designated the surrounding residence the "House of Aion." Fieldwork expanded to encompass structures named the "Hellenistic" House and the Early Roman House. Alongside ongoing archaeological research, teams conduct structural conservation and reconstruction projects across the site.

In 2011, archaeological work broadened to target the Hellenistic agora, followed in 2020 by a multi-institutional project modeling urban layout and public infrastructure.

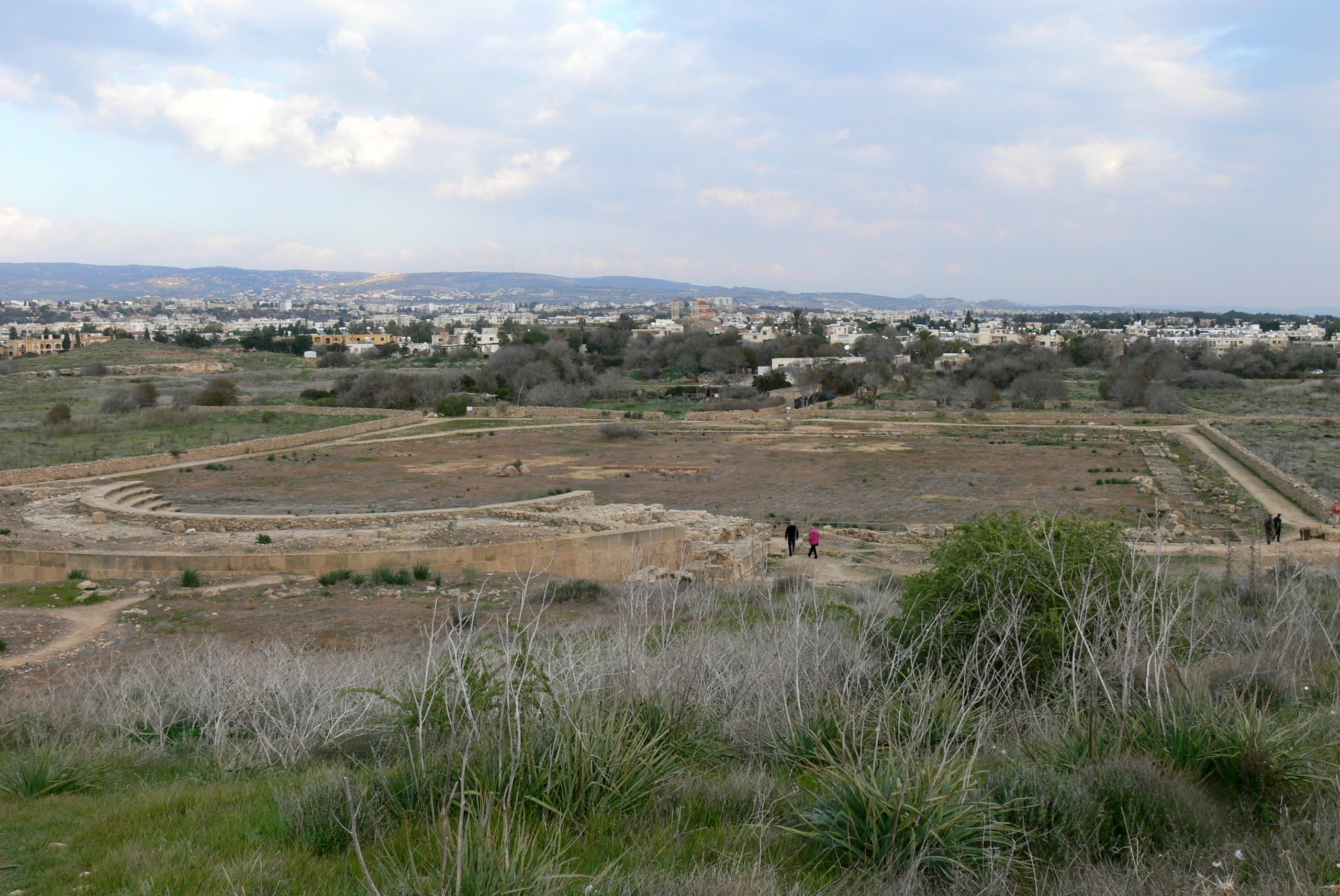
The agora

== Urban design ==
Nea Paphos was laid out with a rectangular street grid in accord with standard Hellenistic urban design. The earliest stone structures were built in the late 4th century BC, shortly after the city's founding. Traces of older mudbrick architecture may belong to an earlier settlement. Later renovations and rebuilding—often in the aftermath of an earthquake—would alter the city's original plan through the following centuries. The most clearly documented of these alterations are from the early Roman period.

The agora of ancient Nea Paphos, in the city center beneath the acropolis, was the primary administrative, economic, and civic hub of the city. The agora site contained structures dating to the city's founding; its formal layout was established in the 2nd century BC. At one point in its history, the portico-enclosed square spanned roughly 150 by 160 meters, covering 2.5 hectares, making it one of the largest Hellenistic agoras in the eastern Mediterranean. The complex functioned continuously through the first half of the 2nd century AD, incorporating an odeon, a structure interpreted as an asclepeion, storage facilities, wells, cisterns, and metalworking shops. Material evidence including imported ceramics, transport amphorae, and coins attests to Nea Paphos's extensive trade networks with Egypt, the Levant, the Aegean, Asia Minor, and the western Mediterranean.

Cypriot archaeologist Kyriakos Nicolaou first excavated the agora between 1975 and 1978, identifying the odeon and porticoes and dating the complex to the Roman period. Archaeologists revised the origin date of the agora complex to the 2nd century BC following systematic excavations and geophysical surveys begun in 2011. In 2020 researchers began to use remote sensing, spatial analysis, and 3D modeling to reconstruct the urban grid of the agora and adjacent Maloutena district.

== Buildings ==
Among the most significant architectural findings in Nea Paphos are the four large and elaborate Roman villas known as the "House of Aion", the "House of Dionysos", the "House of Orpheus", and the "Villa of Theseus". These names were applied by the original excavators, inspired by the villas' well-preserved mosaic floors depicting these mythological figures. In addition, excavations have uncovered an agora, asklipieion or healing temple, basilica, odeion, a Hellenistic-Roman theatre, and a necropolis known as the "Tombs of the Kings".

=== Theatre ===
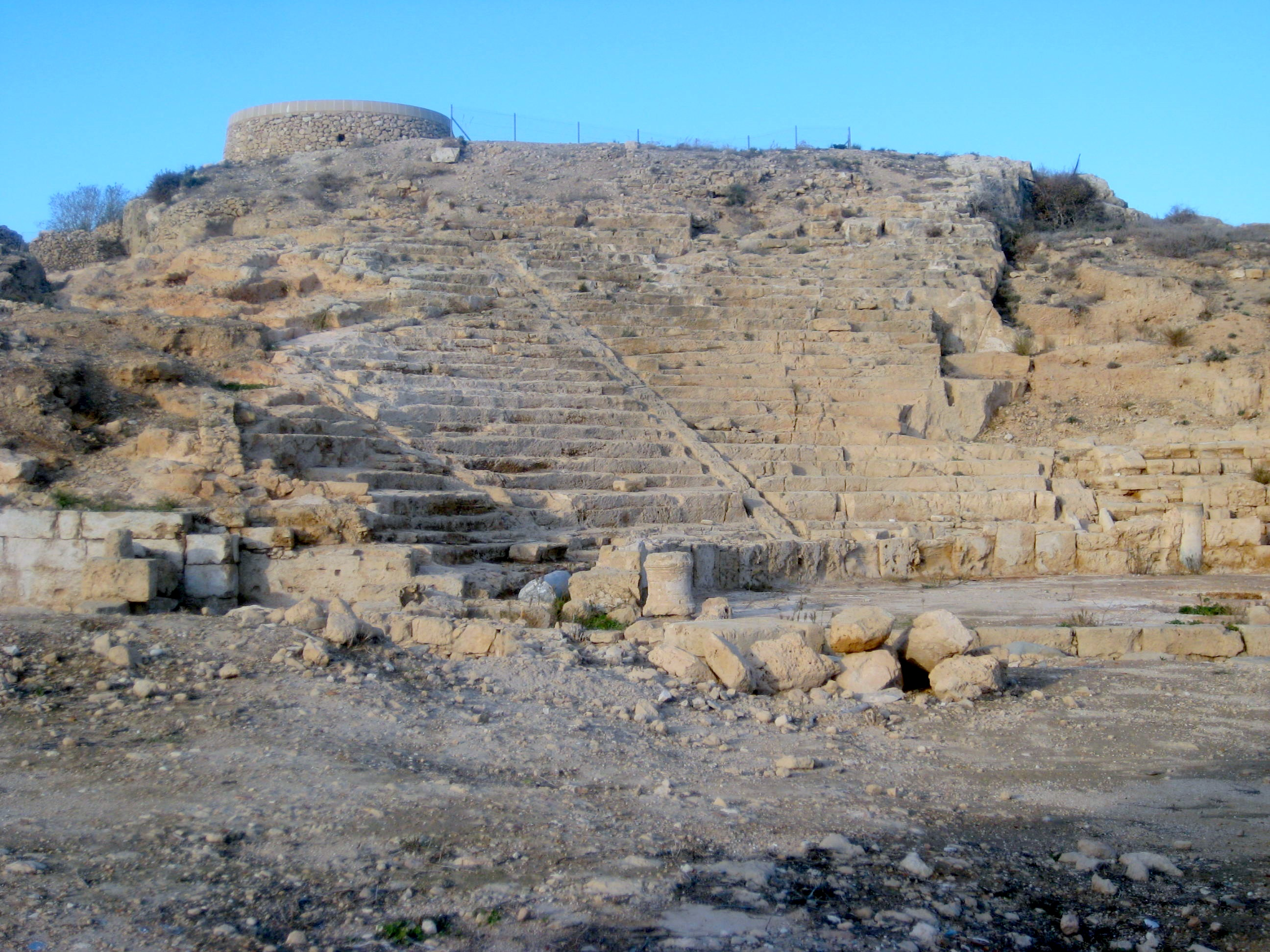
Theatre at Nea Paphos, built 4th century BC

The theatre of Nea Paphos is dated to the end of the 4th century BC, making it one of the city's earliest structures. The theatre occupied a peripheral location, as was typical of ancient urban planning, near a main gate in the northeast of the city. Its location on the southern slope of Fabrika Hill offered spectators a view across the urban core toward the harbor. The theatre has been under excavation by the University of Sydney since 1995.

=== "Hellenistic" House ===
The "Hellenistic" House occupied the western three-quarters of the insula directly south of the Villa of Theseus. It was constructed during the Hellenistic period as a single large residence spanning the entire block and underwent major modifications around the turn of the 1st and 2nd centuries AD, when workers divided the insula into two separate dwellings. Despite its traditional name, initial Hellenistic dating proved incorrect for the surviving Roman-era rebuild. The partially two-story structure featured four courtyards, including a central peristyle garden with polychrome Corinthian and Ionic porticoes, an audience hall, and a small western bath complex with a hypocaust. Fine figurative floor mosaics depicted Armed Aphrodite and the Horae. An earthquake destroyed the residence in the mid-2nd century AD.

Polish archaeologists uncovered the structure in 1986 during excavations south of the Villa of Theseus. Early interpretations suggested that a later Roman house was constructed over debris, but subsequent research confirmed these rooms belonged to the original integrated design. Restoration teams reconstructed the eastern portico and an atrium column, while targeted excavations between 2010 and 2016 further clarified the early developmental phases of the insula.

=== Odeon of Paphos ===
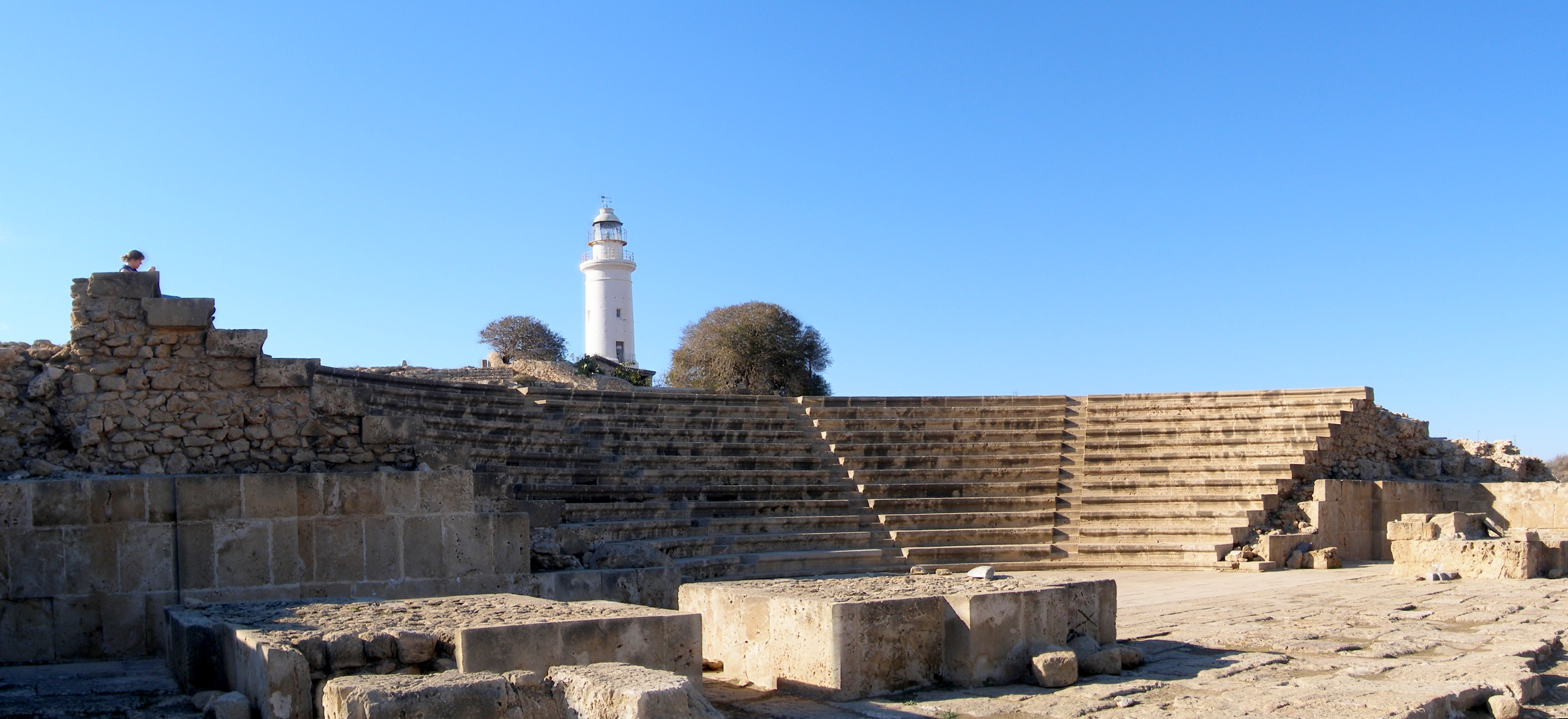
Odeon theatre, second century AD, about 1200 seats

The Odeon of Nea Paphos is a 2nd-century AD semi-circular theater used as a venue for musical, poetic, and theatrical performances. The Odeon was built of limestone blocks, with 12 rows of seating to accommodate approximately 1,200 spectators. Following modern restoration, the site continues to host seasonal cultural events and performances.

=== House of Dionysos ===
The "House of Dionysos", dating to the 3rd century AD, has an atrium plan with an area of nearly 2,000 m^{2} (22,000 sq ft). mosaics occupy roughly a quarter of its interior surfaces. It features a central impluvium surrounded by a rectangular paved portico. The rooms surrounding the atrium also contain mosaic pavements. Bedrooms, bathrooms, and a small peristyle vivarium occupy the eastern sector, while kitchens and workshops lie to the west. The main street entrance is at the southwest corner. Painted stucco remains reveal that its interior walls were decorated with polychrome geometric and floral patterns as well as with mosaics.

These intricate polychrome mosaics cover the floors of several rooms; mosaics depicting hunting scenes border three sides of the atrium. The western portico contains four mythological-themed panels depicting Pyramos and Thisbe; Dionysos, Akme, Ikarios, and the First Wine Drinkers; Poseidon and Amymone; and Apollo pursuing Daphne. The tablinum contains a panel depicting the Triumph of Dionysos flanked by the Dioskouroi. Other rooms feature depictions of Hippolytos and Phaedra, Ganymede and the Eagle, a peacock, the Horae, and Narcissus. Additional chambers preserve purely geometric mosaic patterns in varied colors.

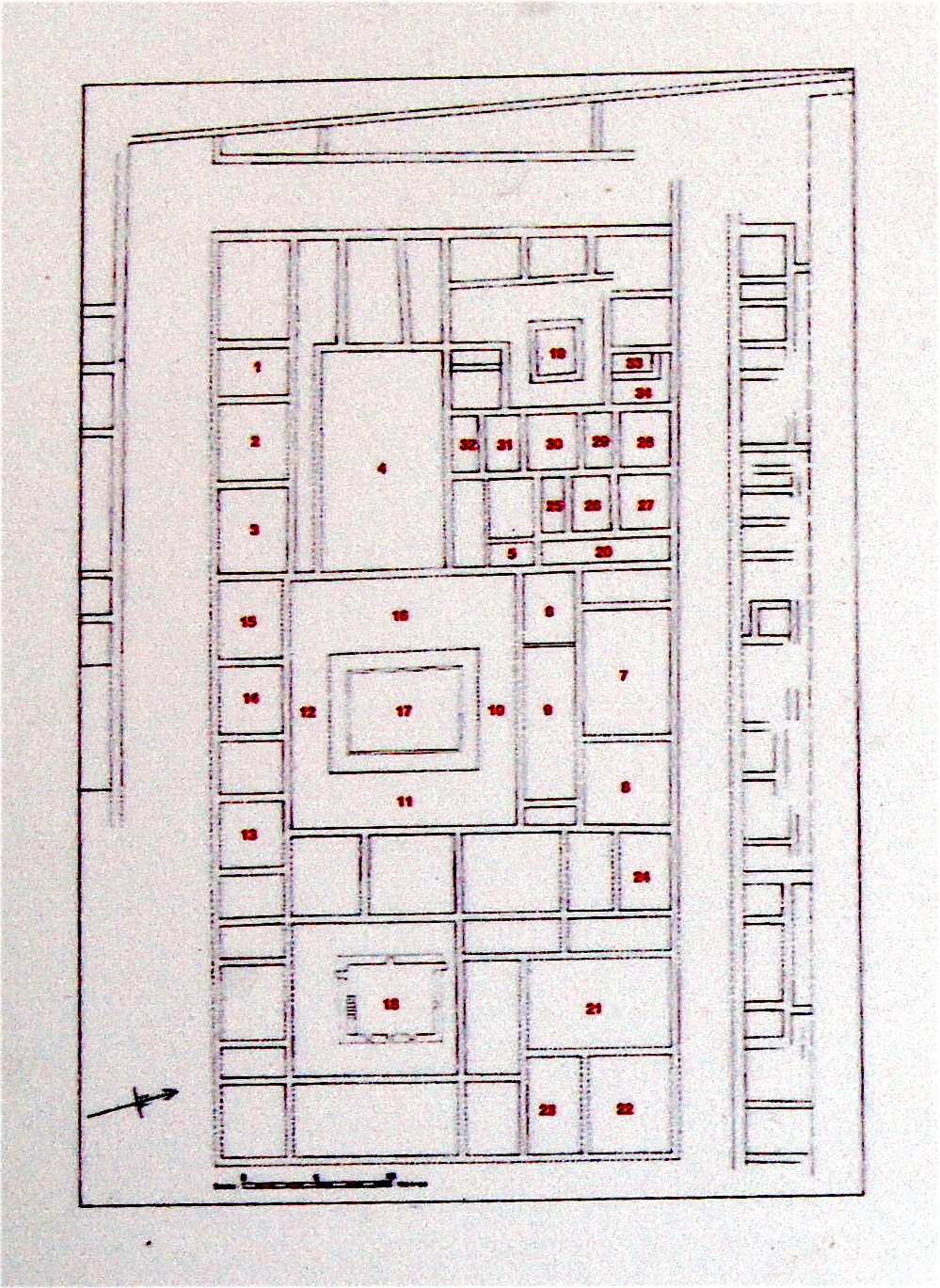
House of Dionysos plan

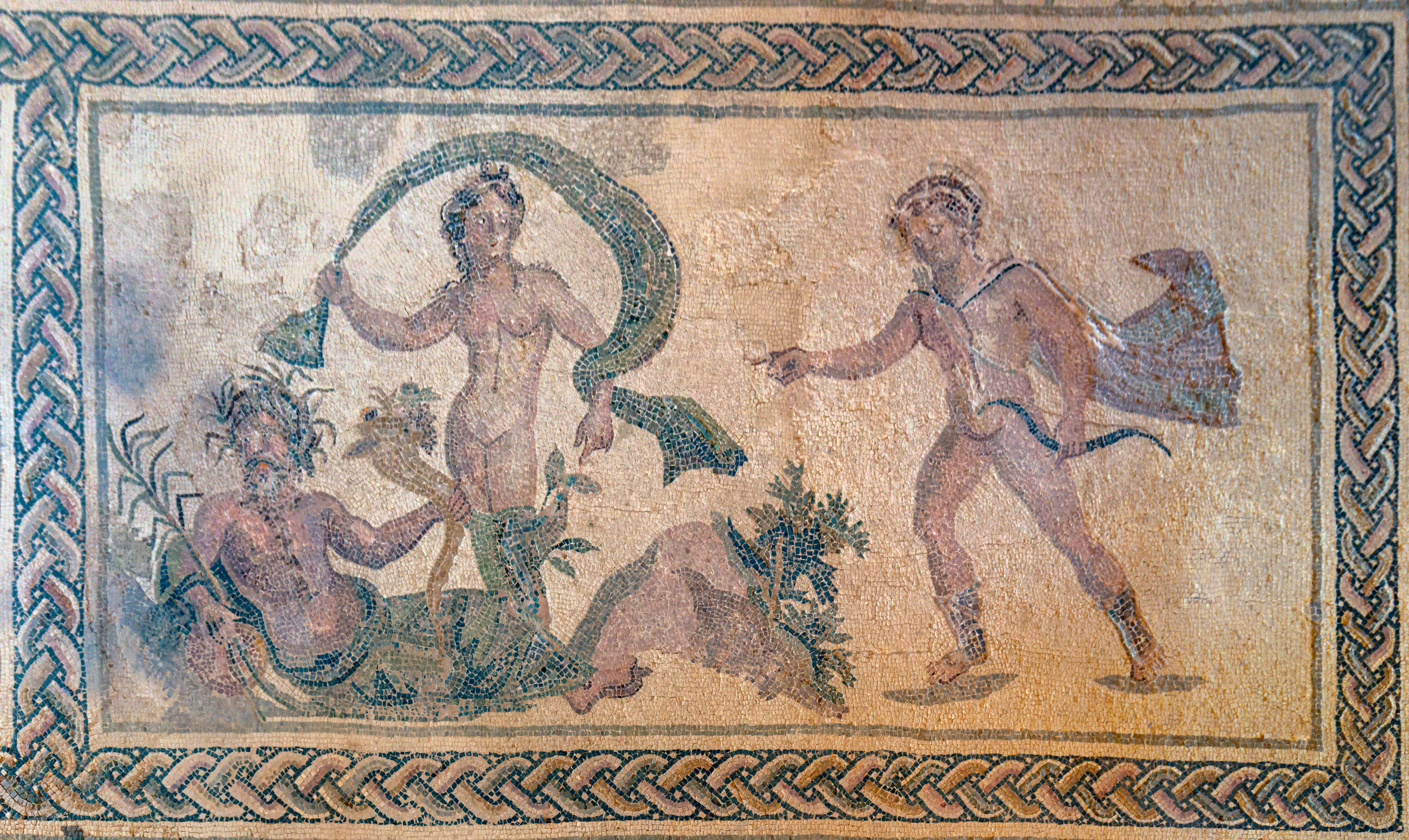
Apollo and Daphne

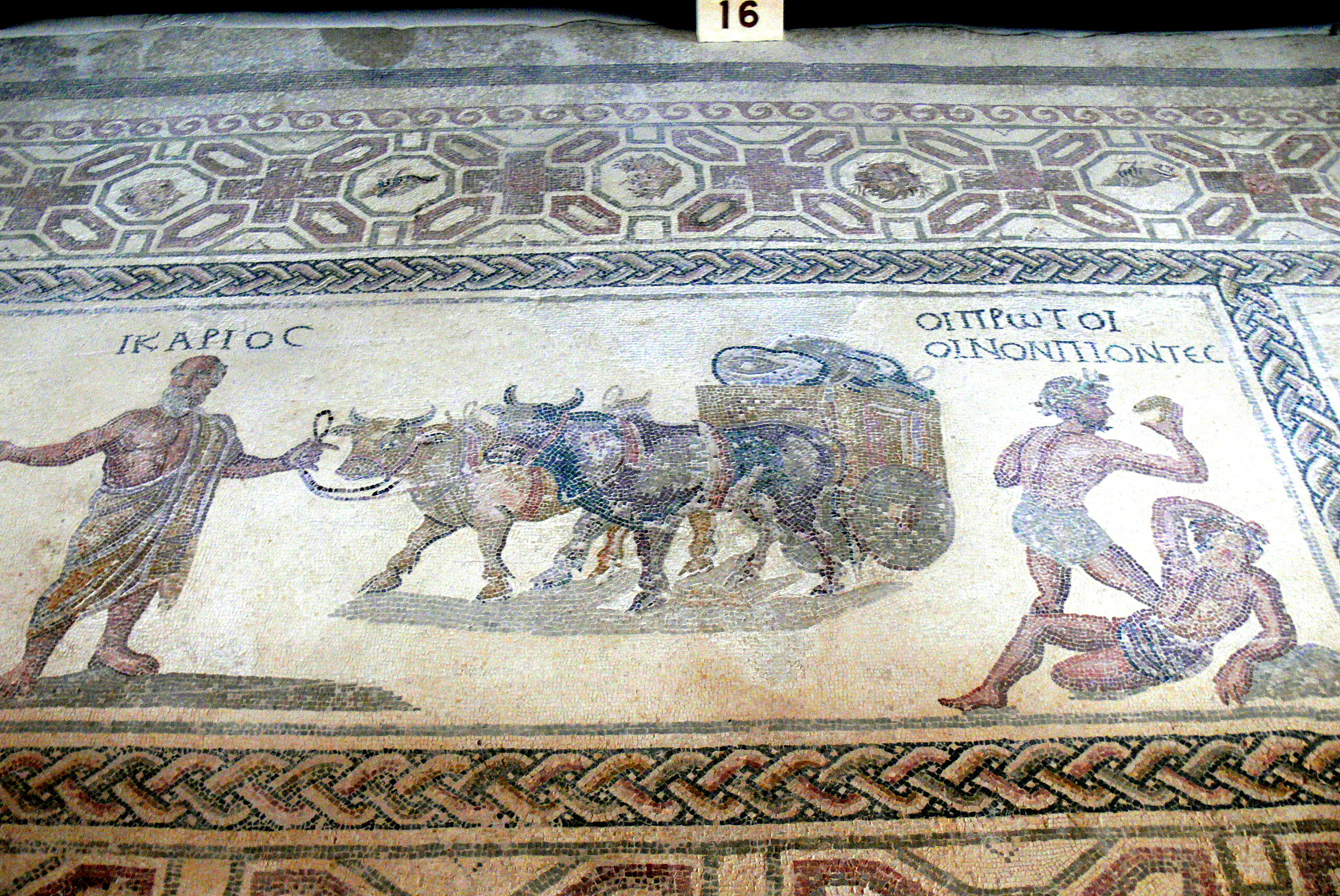
Ikarios

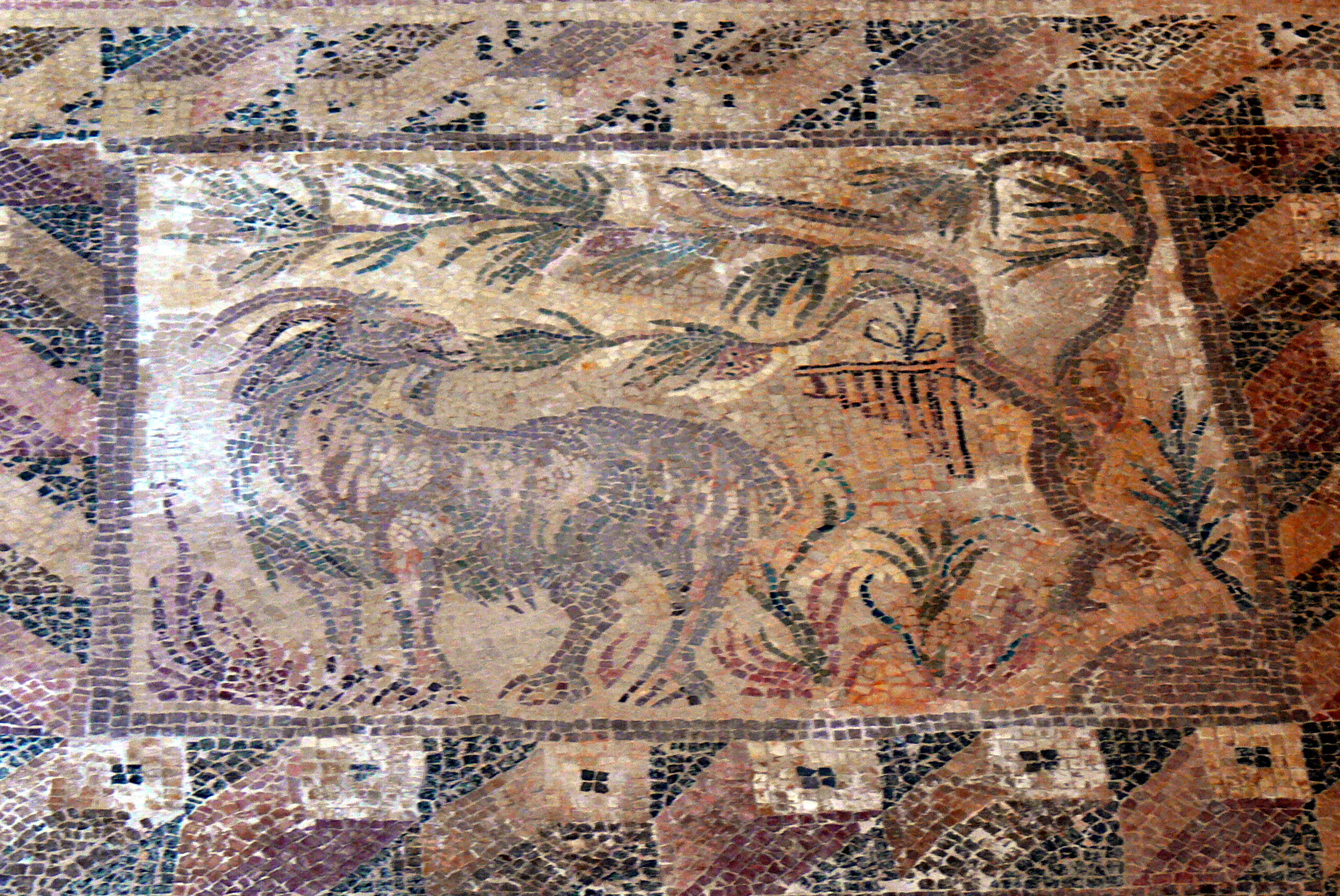
Horae

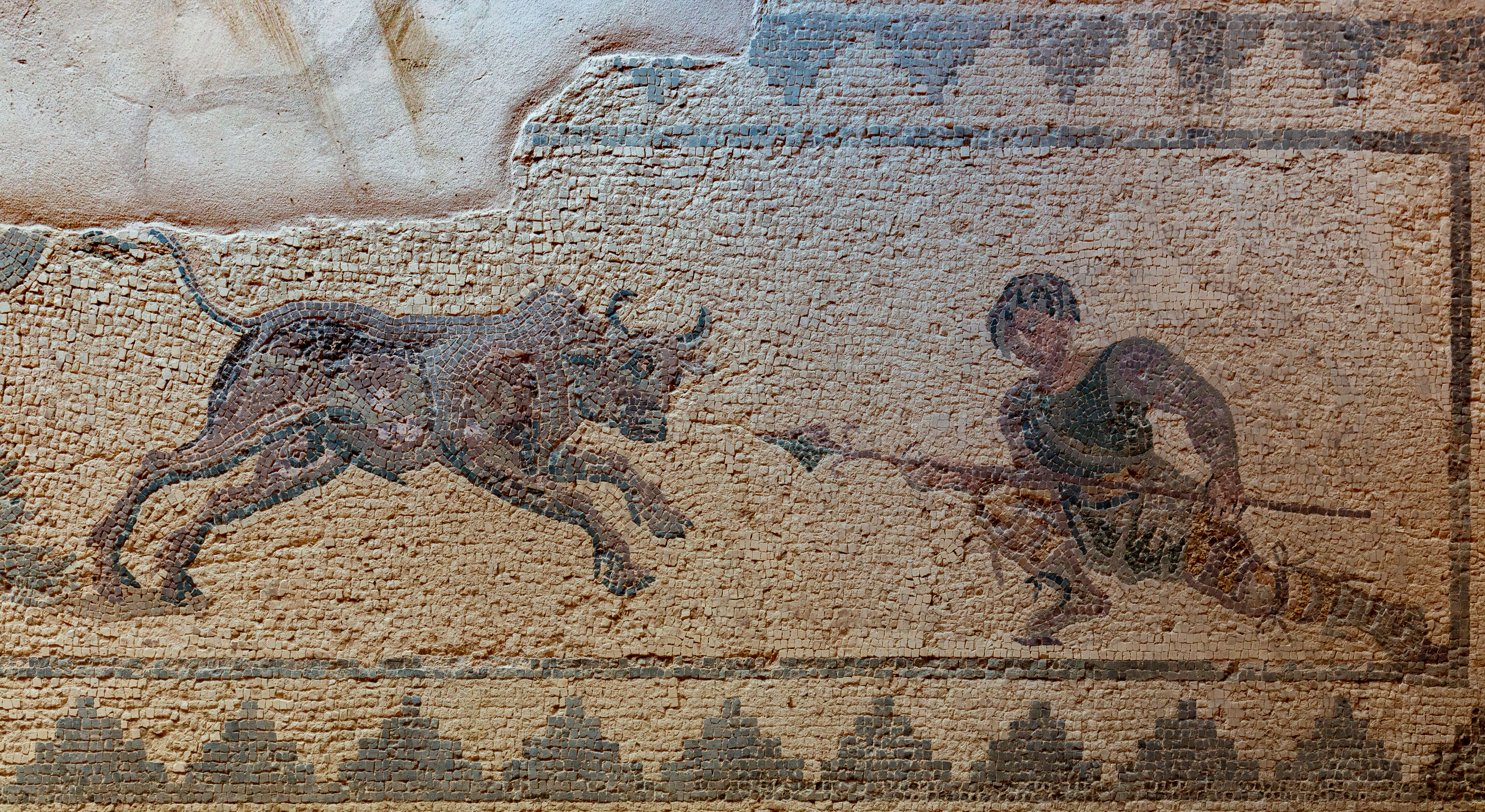
Hunting scene

=== House of Orpheus ===
The House of Orpheus is a villa west of the House of Theseus. Three mosaics dated to the 3rd century AD are known as "Orpheus and his Lyre" (an Orpheus mosaic), "Hercules and the Lion of Nemea", and "the Amazon" after their mythological depictions. They are currently not on view to the public.

=== Villa of Theseus ===
The "Villa of Theseus" was an expansive residence for elites and a key administrative building within Nea Paphos. It was built in stages beginning in the early 3rd century AD. Occupying the northern section of its insula, the Villa originally featured a south wing with a large portico and a basilical hall, suggesting a semi-public function. A major expansion in the second half of the 4th century AD added a massive peristyle courtyard measuring approximately 56 by 56 meters. Subsequent 5th-century AD modifications added an atrium vestibule and baths. The primary reception room featured an enlarged apse and a mosaic depicting Achilles. The Villa was abandoned by its owners in Late Antiquity and reoccupied by squatters.

Polish archaeologists uncovered the structure during initial field operations aimed at defining the layout of the site's central courtyard; it is the largest structure within the Polish excavation sector. Excavations along the south wing revealed a floor mosaic depicting Theseus battling the Minotaur.

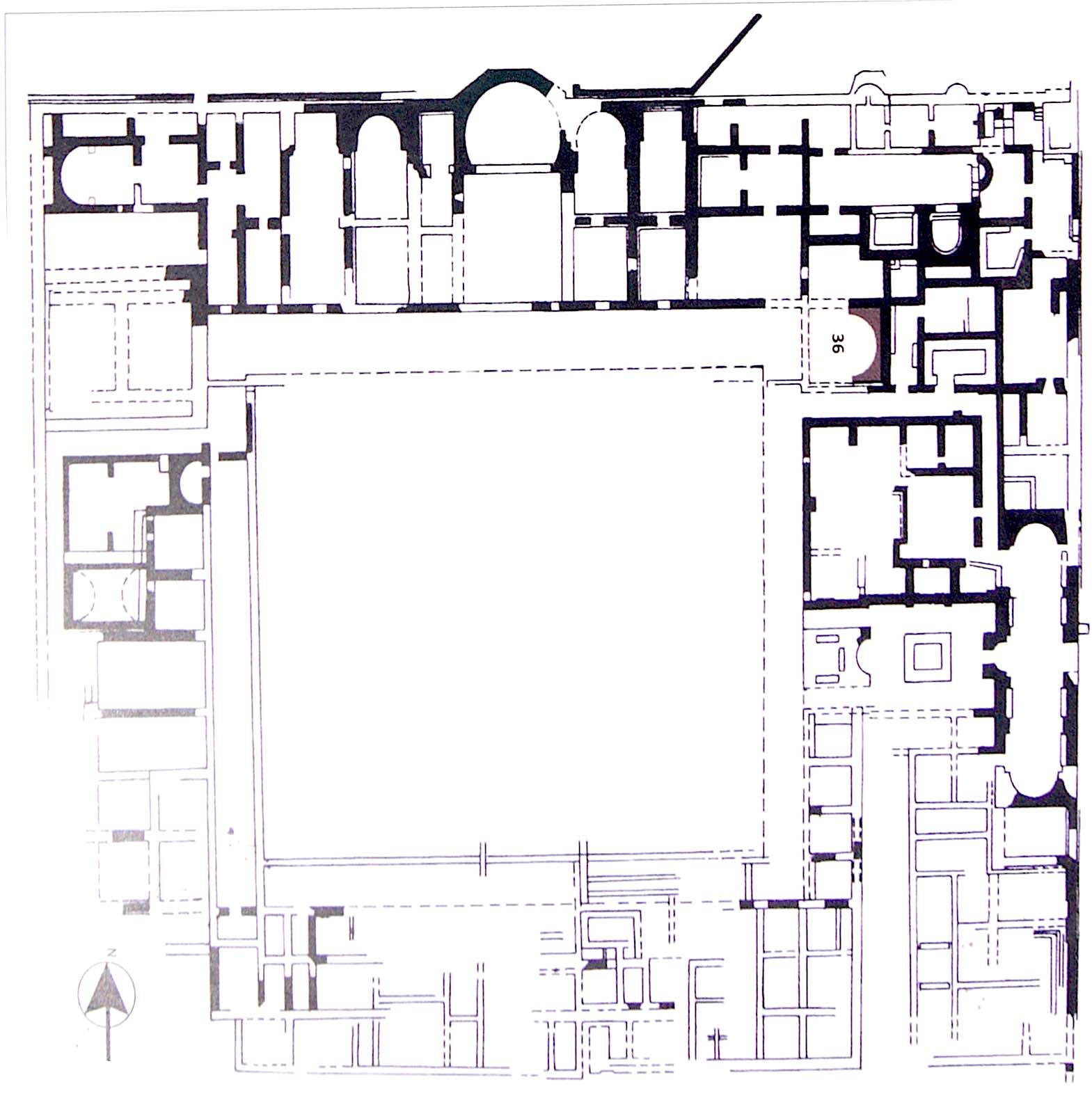
House of Theseus

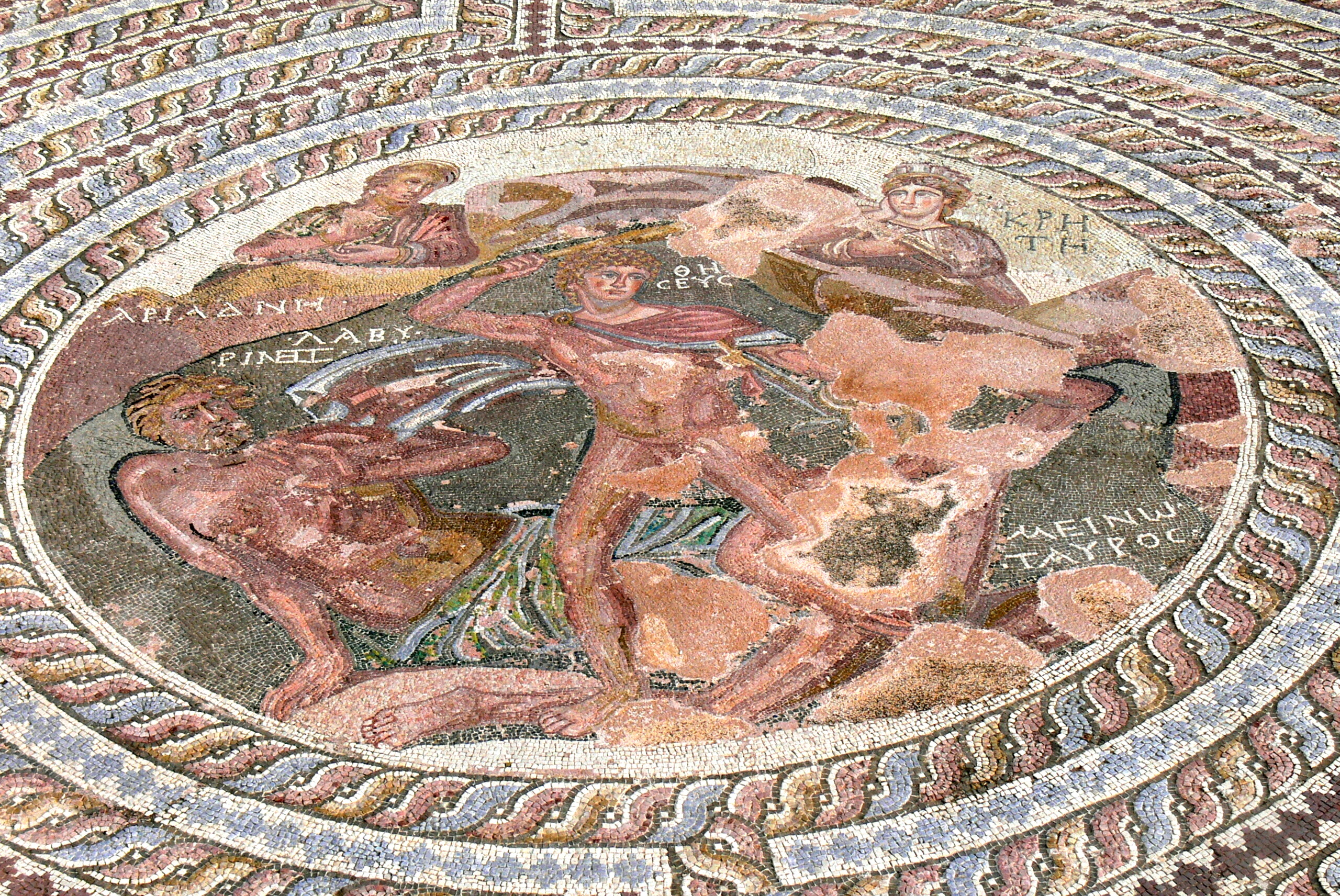
Theseus Mosaic

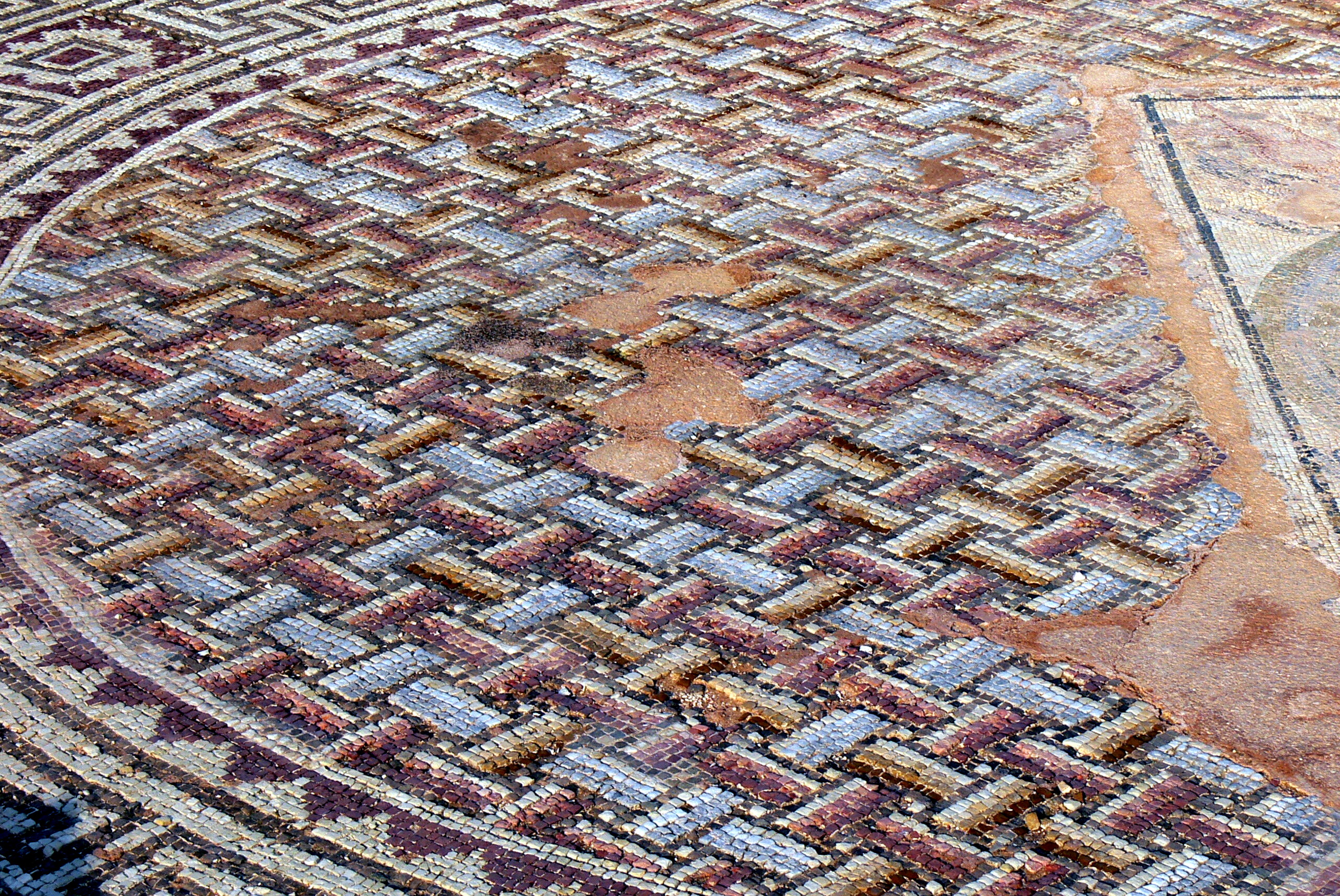
Geometric Mosaic

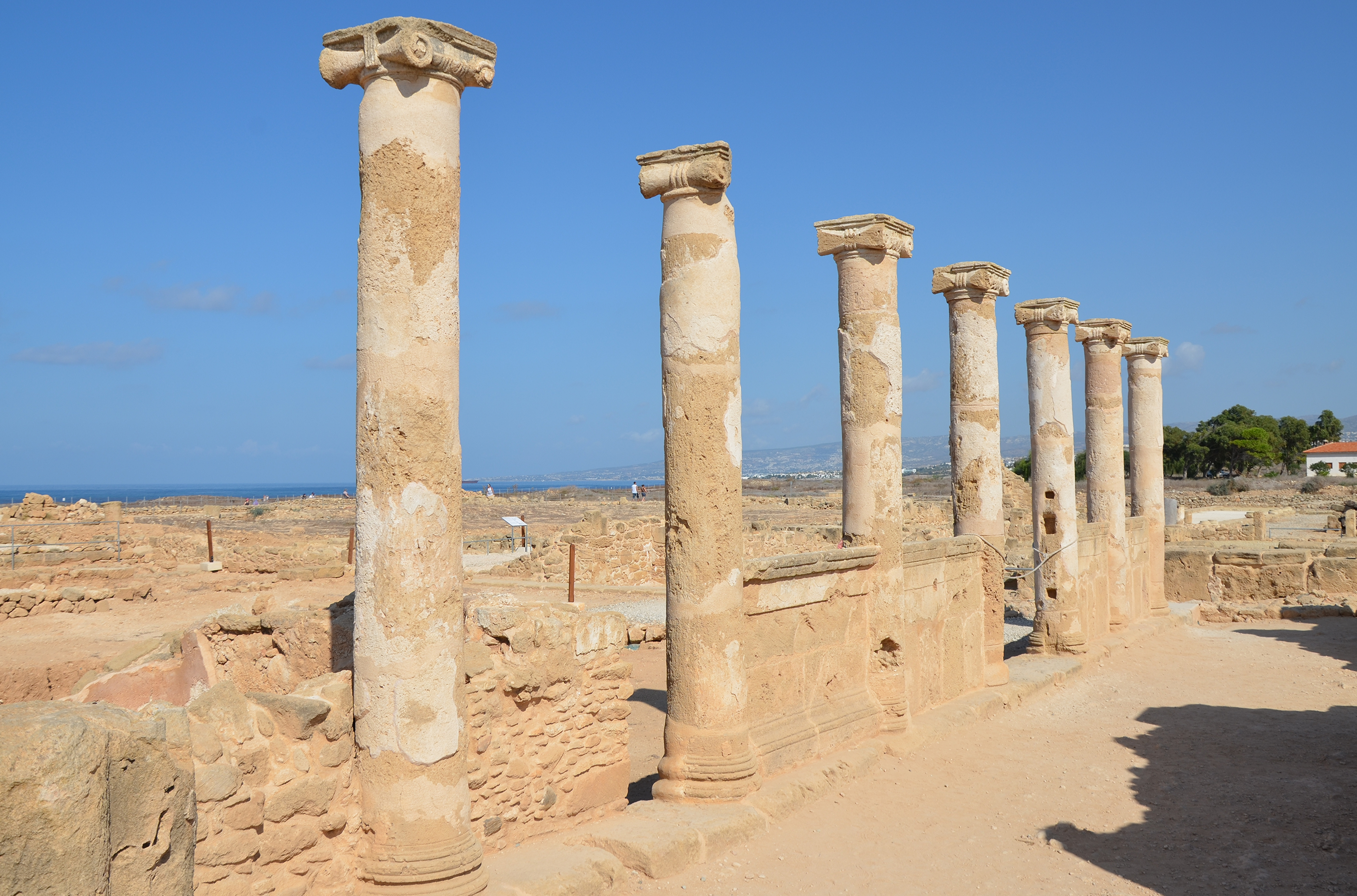
The House of Theseus in Paphos Archaeological Park

=== House of Aion ===
The "House of Aion" is best known for its high-quality, large-scale figurative floor mosaics, featuring a central panel that depicts Aion, the ancient Greek deity of time and eternity. It occupied part of an insula constructed over the remains of an earlier residential block, which had previously been integrated into the neighboring Villa of Theseus. Construction of the underlying insula dates to the 4th century AD. In its final structural phase, the building was divided into two distinct components: the House of Aion proper to the south and the North-Eastern House to the north.

Polish archaeologists first encountered traces of the structure in 1982 while excavating a small test trench east of the street adjacent to the Villa of Theseus, recovering a fragment of a mosaic border strip. Full-scale excavations in 1983 exposed the primary central floor mosaic depicting Aion, leading researchers to designate the residence "the House of Aion". Subsequent fieldwork revealed the broader structural layout of the building.

The floor mosaic was likely in a triclinium or reception room. It has five figurative scenes, all surrounded by a geometric frame. It is of high quality, with enigmatic and unusual iconography. The scenes have been called: "The birth of Dionysus", "Leda and the Swan", "Beauty contest between Cassiopeia and the Nereids", "Apollo and Marsyas", and the "Triumphant procession of Dionysus".

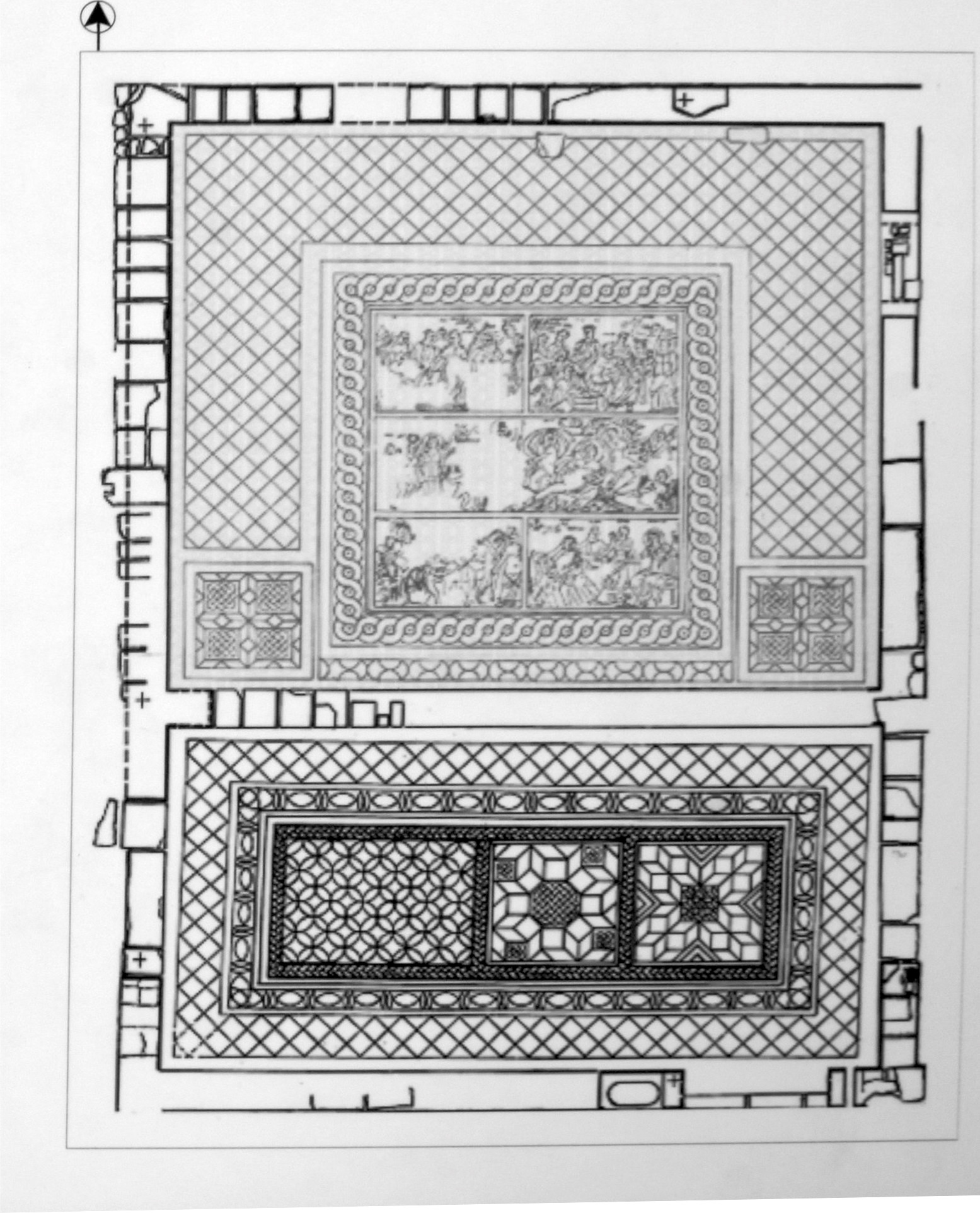
Plan of triclinium of the House of Aion

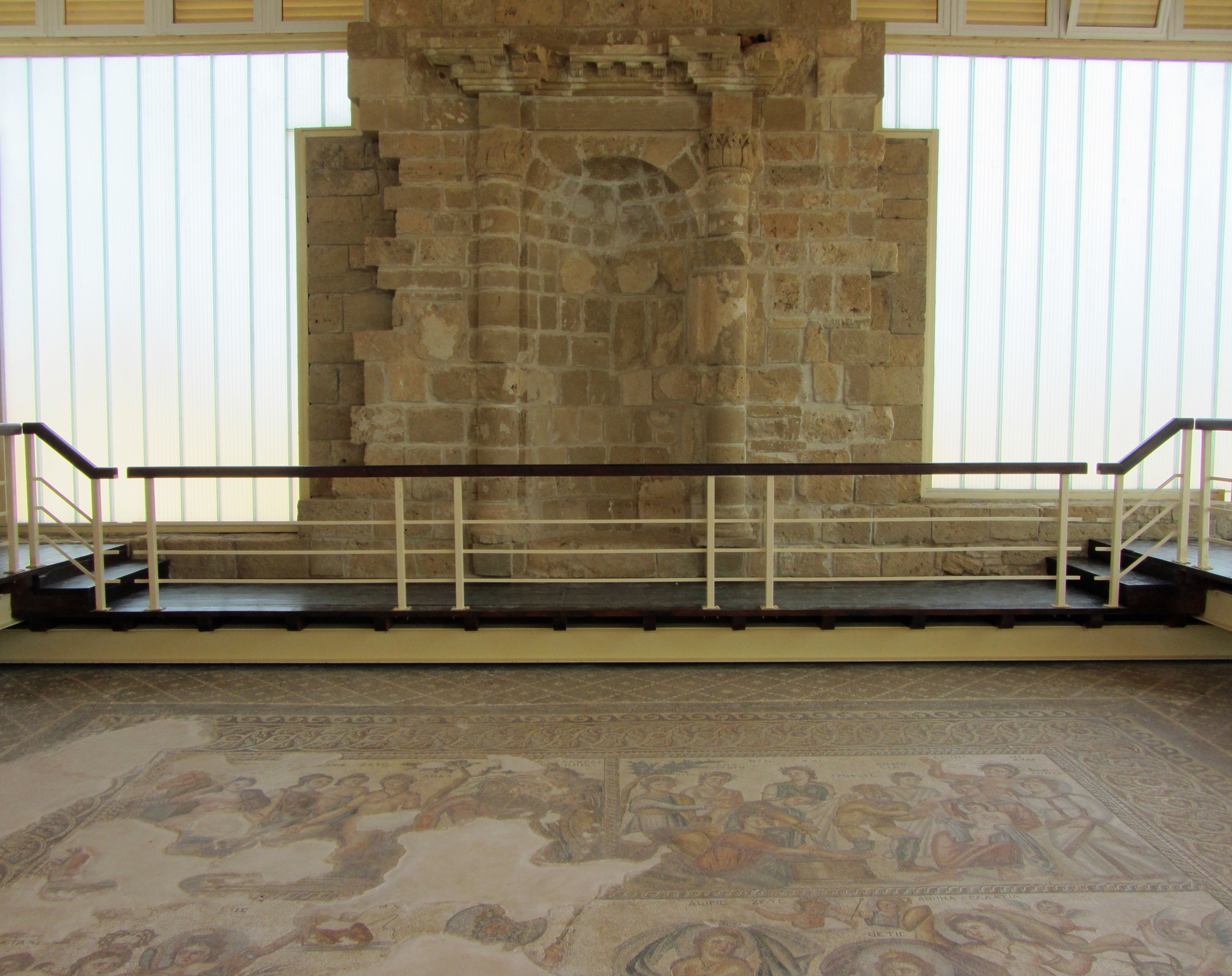
Reconstructed villa wall

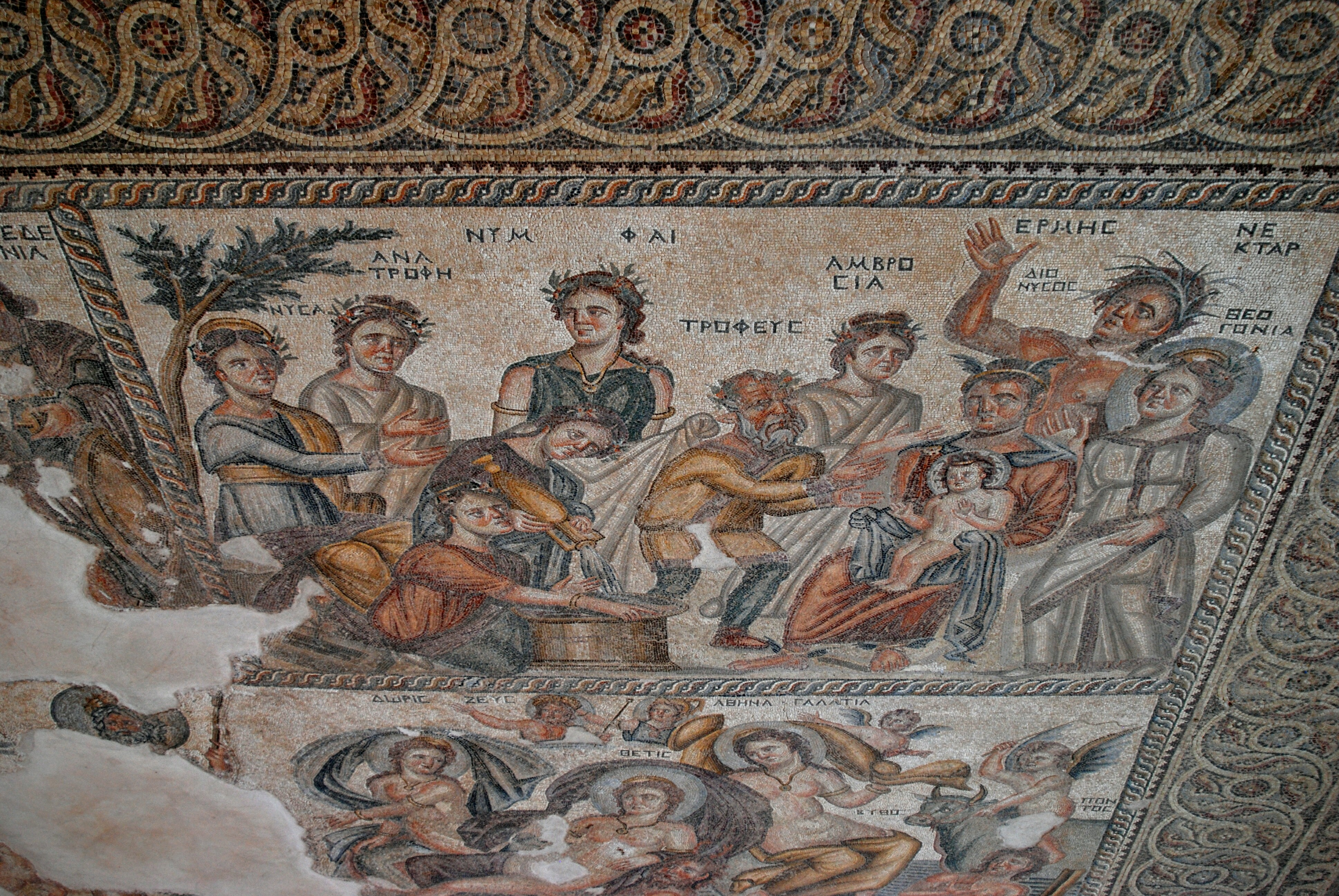
Birth of Dionysos

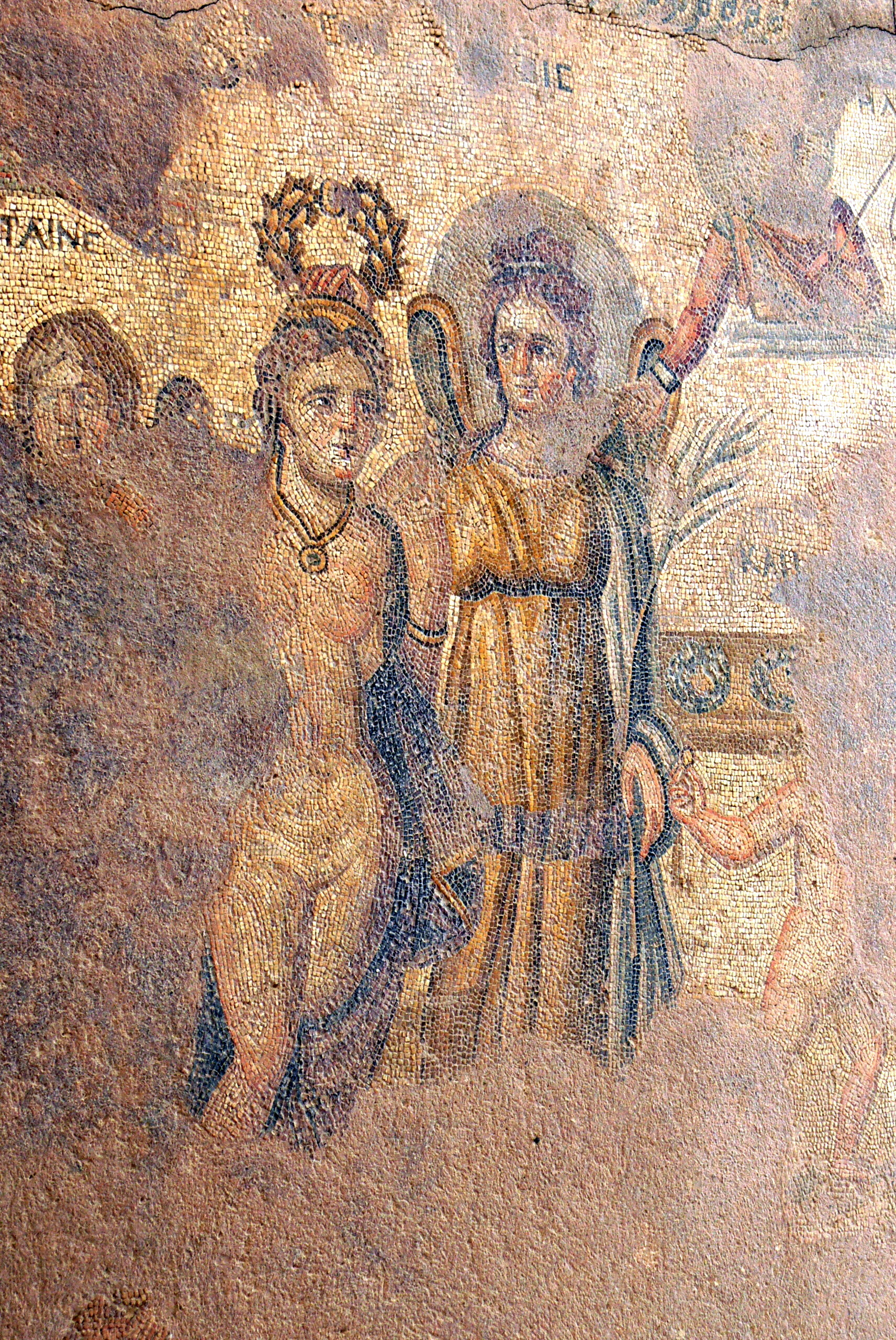
Beauty contest between Cassiopeia and the Nereids

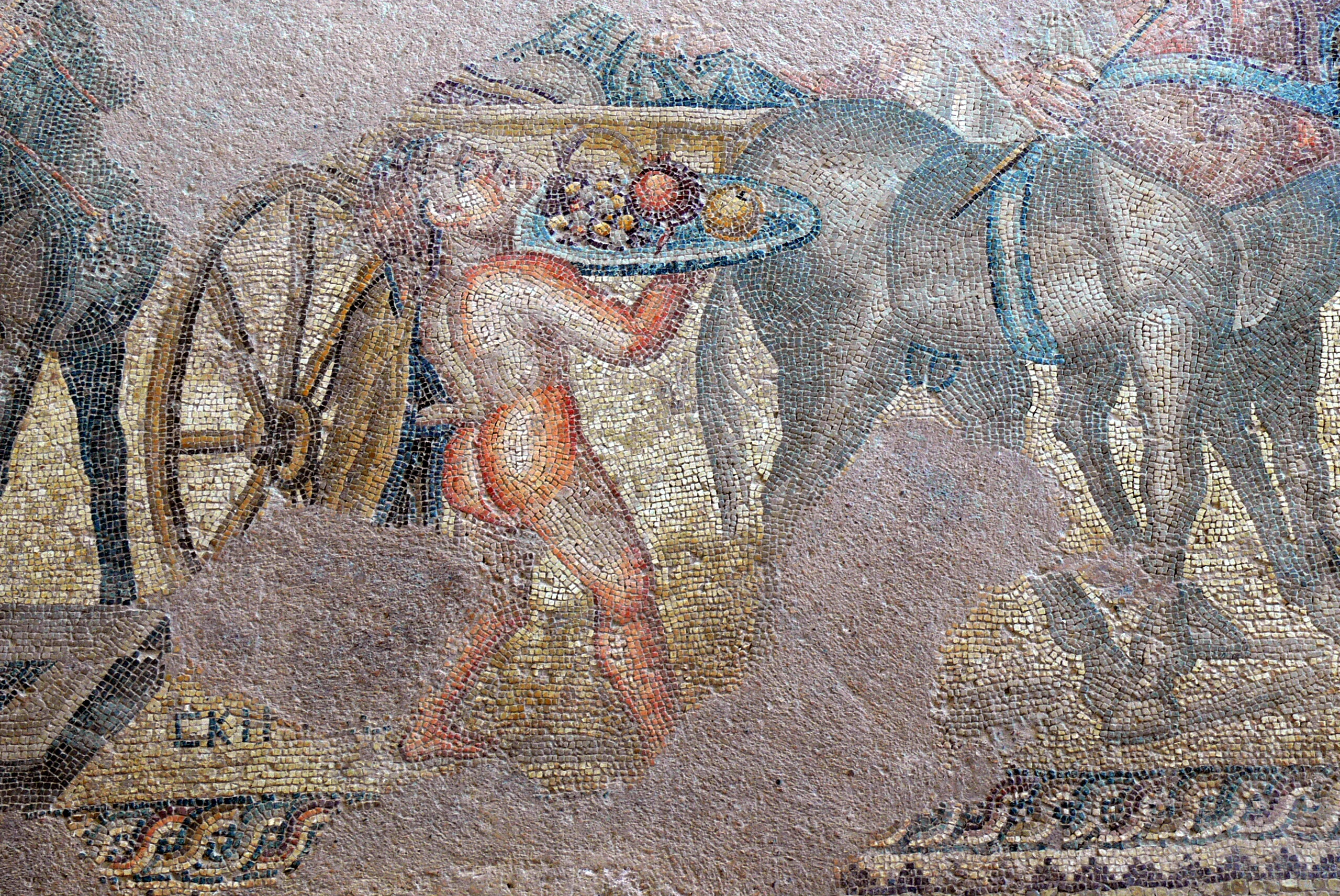
Triumph of Dionysos - Satyr Skirtos offering fruit to Dionysos

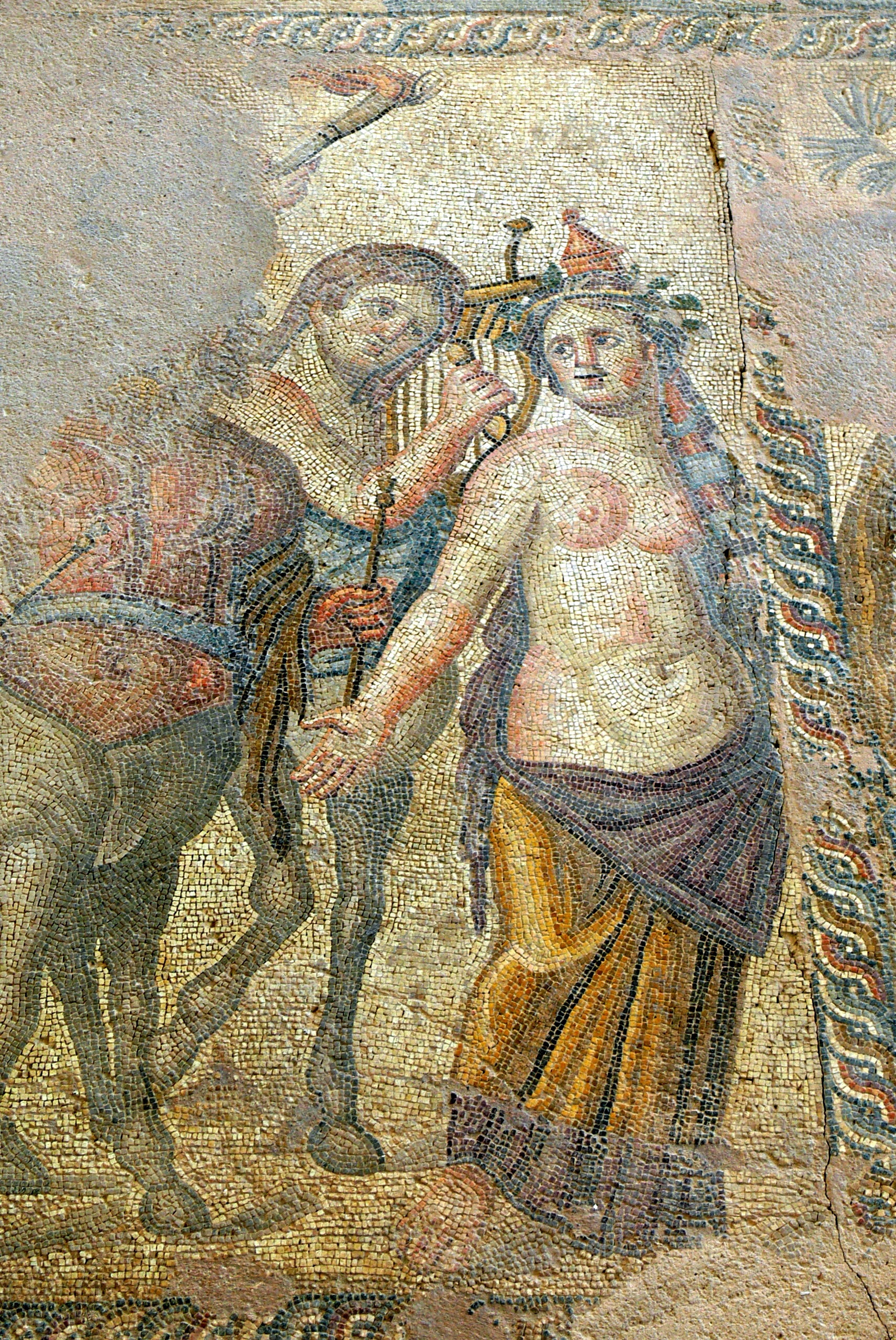
Triumph of Dionysos - Centaur and Maenad

=== Basilica of Panagia Limeniotissa ===
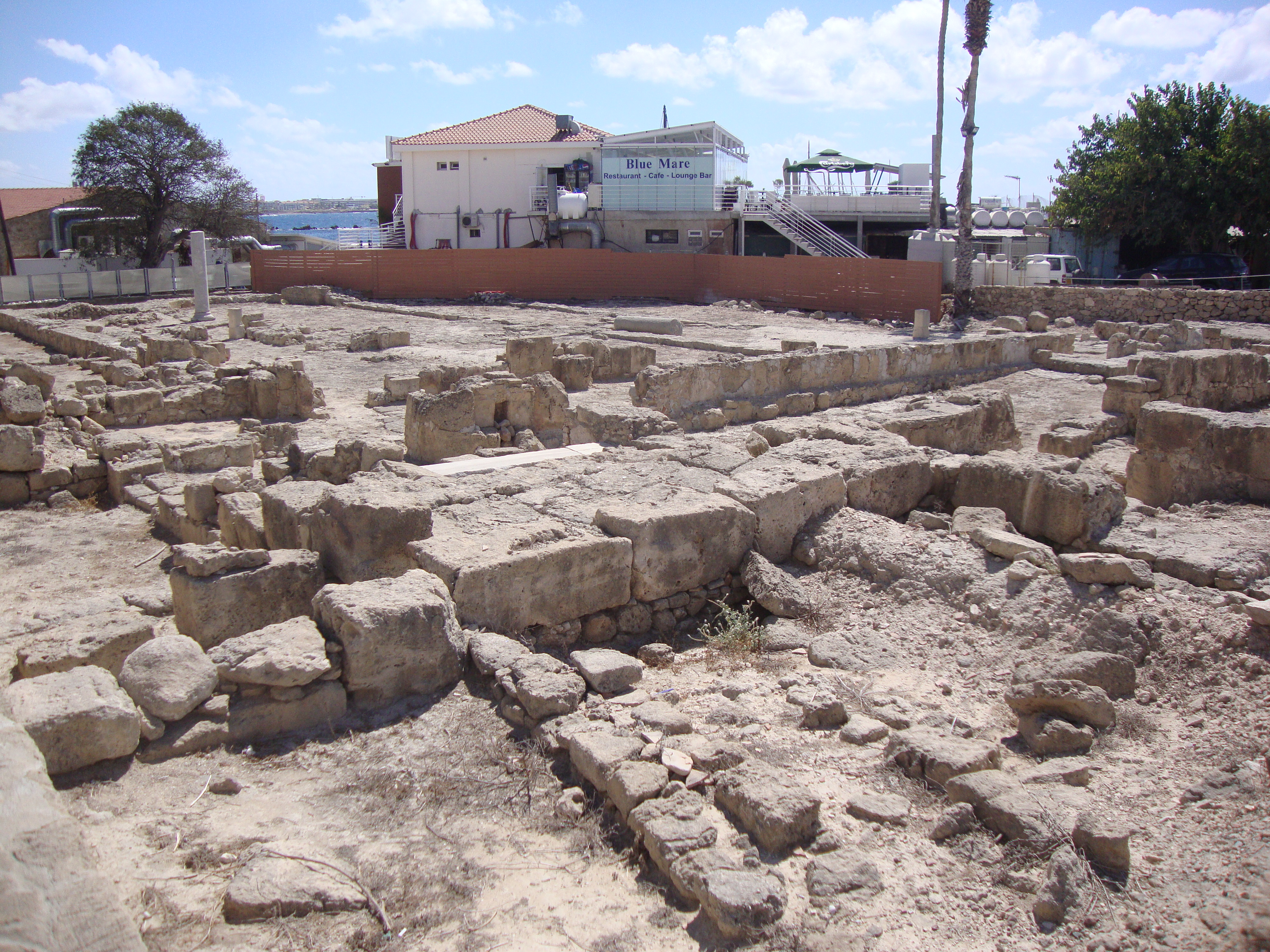
Basilica of Panagia Limeniotissa

The Basilica of Panagia Limeniotissa was built in the early 5th century AD during the Early Christian period, when Cyprus formed part of the Byzantine Empire, and was destroyed and rebuilt several times in Late Antiquity and the Middle Ages.

== Material culture ==
Material culture findings includes marble and limestone statuary, votive statuettes, and altar deposits. Small finds comprise coin hoards, mint dies, engraved gems, and Ptolemaic and Roman jewelry.

== Sources ==
- "Agora". Department of Classical Archaeology, Jagiellonian University.
- "The Ancient Odeon of Paphos: Echoes of the Past". This Is Pafos.
- "Αρχαιολογικός Χώρος Νέας Πάφου" [Archaeological Site of Nea Paphos]. Department of Antiquities (in Greek). Deputy Ministry of Culture, Republic of Cyprus.
- "The Basilica of Panagia Limeniotissa". Terrabook.
- Christodoulou, Paraskevi; Satraki, Anna, eds. (2010). POCA 2007: Postgraduate Cypriot Archaeology Conference. Newcastle upon Tyne: Cambridge Scholars Publishing. ISBN 978-1-4438-2571-9.
- Cohen, Getzel M. (1995). The Hellenistic Settlements in Europe, the Islands and Asia Minor. University of California Press. ISBN 978-0-520-91408-7. Archived from the original on 11 September 2015.
- Green, Richard (2007). "Fabrika ancient theatre in Paphos: University of Sydney excavations". Cyprus Today. 45 (2). The Australian Mission to Paphos: 2–21.
- Iacovou, Maria (2018). "From the Late Cypriot Polities to the Iron Age "Kingdoms": Understanding the Political Landscape of Cyprus from Within". In Cannavò, Anna; Thély, Ludovic (eds.). Les royaumes de Chypre à l'épreuve de l'histoire: Transitions et ruptures de la fin de l'âge du Bronze au début de l'époque hellénistique [The Kingdoms of Cyprus Tested by History: Transitions and Ruptures from the End of the Bronze Age to the Beginning of the Hellenistic Period]. Bulletin de Correspondance Hellénique Suppléments (in French). Vol. 60. Athens: École française d'Athènes. doi:10.4000/books.efa.2901. ISBN 978-2-86958-307-8.
- Iacovou, Maria (2019). "Palaepaphos: Unlocking the Landscape Context of the Sanctuary of the Cypriot Goddess". Open Archaeology. 5 (1): 204–234. doi:10.1515/opar-2019-0015.
- Kondoleon, Christine (1995). Domestic and Divine: Roman Mosaics in the House of Dionysos. Cornell University Press. ISBN 978-0-8014-3058-9.
- Kubicka-Sowińska, Anna; Miszk, Łukasz; Zachar, Paulina; et al. (2024). "Reconstructing the Urban Fabric of Nea Paphos by Comparison with Regularly Planned Mediterranean Cities, Using 3D Procedural Modeling and Spatial Analysis". Bulletin of the American Society of Overseas Research. 391 (1): 163–189. doi:10.1086/730152.
- "Nea Paphos". Polish Centre of Mediterranean Archaeology, University of Warsaw.
- Nicolaou, K. (1976). Stillwell, Richard; MacDonald, William L.; McAllister, Marian Holland (eds.). "PAPHOS (Kato Paphos) Cyprus". Perseus Digital Library. Princeton University Press.
- Nocoń, Kamila (2021). "Understanding changes in the supply pattern of Roman cooking pottery from Morphou Bay to Nea Paphos: evidence from the Paphos Agora Project". Polish Archaeology in the Mediterranean. 30 (2): 231–254. doi:10.31338/uw.2083-537X.pam30.2.16.
- Olszewski, Marek T. (2013). "The Iconographic Programme of the Cyprus Mosaic from the House of Aion Reinterpreted as an Anti-Christian Polemic". In Dobrowolski, W.; Płóciennik, T. (eds.). Et in Arcadia Ego: Studia Memoriae Professoris Thomae Mikocki Dicata. Warsaw: Institute of Archaeology, University of Warsaw. pp. 207–239.
- "Paphos". UNESCO World Heritage Centre.
- "Paphos Agora Project". Department of Classical Archaeology, Jagiellonian University.
- "Paphos Theatre Archaeological Project". Chau Chak Wing Museum, The University of Sydney.
- Papuci-Władyka, Ewdoksia (2015). "Nea Paphos: 50 Years of Polish Archaeological Research" (PDF). Polish Centre of Mediterranean Archaeology, University of Warsaw. Warsaw: The Embassy of the Republic of Poland in Nicosia and the Polish Centre of Mediterranean Archaeology, University of Warsaw.
- Solsten, Eric (January 1991). "Cyprus : a country study" (PDF). loc.gov. Washington, D.C. : Federal Research Division, Library of Congress : For sale by the Supt. of Docs., U.S. G.P.O., [1993]. Archived (PDF) from the original on 29 August 2025.
- "Μνημεία Παγκόσμιας Κληρονομιάς – Πάφος" [World Heritage Monuments – Paphos]. Τμήμα Αρχαιοτήτων - Υφυπουργείο Πολιτισμού (in Greek). Department of Antiquities, Republic of Cyprus.
