= Salamis, Cyprus =

Ancient city-kingdom of Cyprus

Salamis
- Σαλαμίς (Ancient Greek); Σαλαμίνα (Greek)
- Salamína
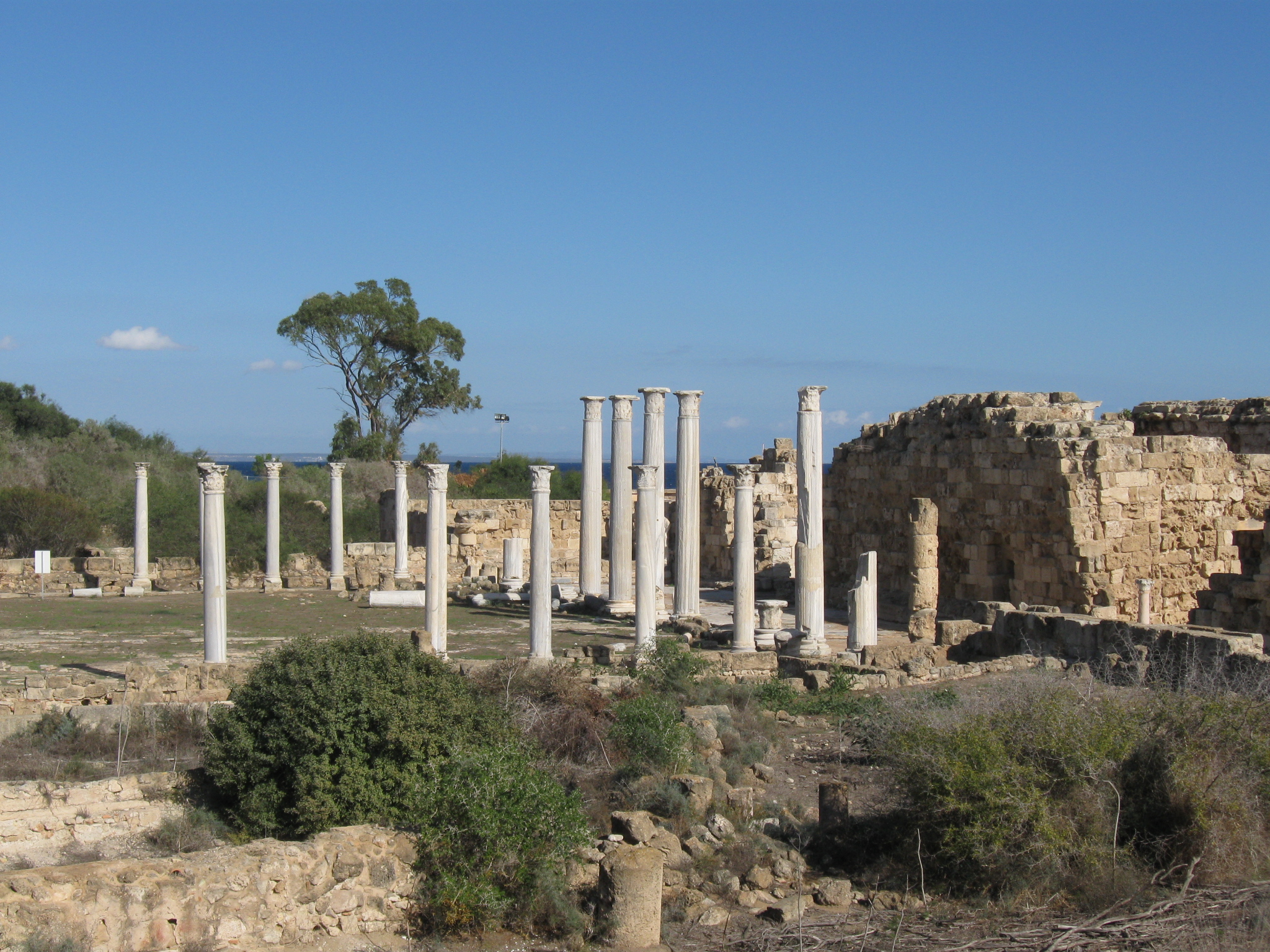
- The gymnasium at Salamis

- Location within Cyprus
- 35°11′N 33°54′E
- Type: Settlement
- Location: Famagusta District, Cyprus

Site notes
- Website: Virtual Tour of Salamis

Salamis (Ancient Greek: Σαλαμίς; Greek: Σαλαμίνα; Turkish: Salamis) was an ancient Greek city-state on the east coast of Cyprus, at the mouth of the river Pedieos, 6 km (3.7 mi) north of modern Famagusta. According to tradition, the founder of Salamis was Teucer, son of Telamon, king of the Greek island of Salamis, who could not return home after the Trojan War because he had failed to avenge his brother Ajax.

== History ==
=== Early history ===
The earliest archaeological finds go back to the eleventh century BC (Late Bronze Age III). The copper ores of Cyprus made the island an essential node in the earliest trade networks, and Cyprus was a source of the orientalizing cultural traits of mainland Greece at the end of the Greek Dark Ages, hypothesized by Walter Burkert in 1992. Children's burials in Canaanite jars indicate a Phoenician presence. A harbour and a cemetery from this period have been excavated. The town is mentioned in Assyrian inscriptions as one of the kingdoms of Iadnana (Cyprus). In 877 BC, an Assyrian army reached the Mediterranean shores for the first time. In 708 BC, the city-kings of Cyprus paid homage to Sargon II of Assyria (Burkert). The first coins were minted in the 6th century BC, following Persian prototypes.

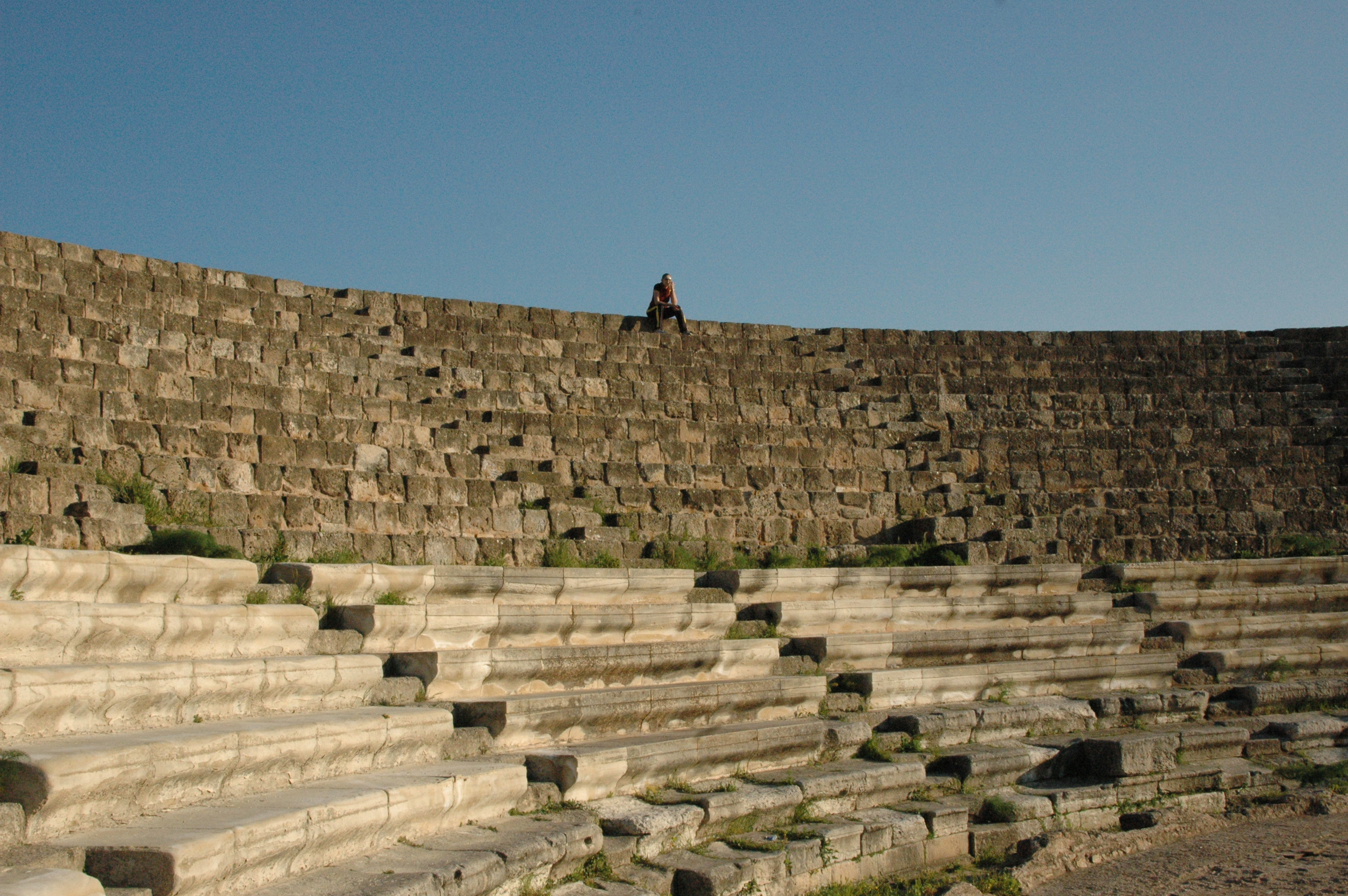
The theatre in Salamis

Cyprus was under the control of the Assyrians at this time but the city-states of the island enjoyed relative independence as long as they paid their tribute to the Assyrian king. This allowed the kings of the various cities to accumulate wealth and power. Certain burial customs observed in the "royal tombs" of Salamis relate directly to Homeric rites, such as the sacrifice of horses in honor of the dead and the offering of jars of olive oil. Some scholars have interpreted this phenomenon as the result of influence of the Homeric epics in Cyprus. Most of the grave goods come from the Levant or Egypt.

According to the foundation myth, the founder of Salamis is said to be Teucer, son of Telamon, who could not return home after the Trojan War because he had failed to avenge his brother Ajax. There is however some evidence that the area had been occupied long before the alleged arrival of Mycenaeans (at Enkomi) and the town of Salamis was developed as a replacement when Enkomi was isolated from the sea. There is otherwise little direct evidence to support the foundation myth.

=== In the Greek period ===
In the 11th century BC, the town was confined to a rather small area around the harbour but soon expanded westwards to occupy the area, which today is covered by forest. The cemetery of Salamis covers a large area from the western limits of the forest to the Monastery of Saint Barnabas to the west, to the outskirts of the village of Ayios Serghios to the north, and to the outskirts of Enkomi to the south. It contains tombs dating from the 9th century BC down to the Early Christian period. The earlier tombs are within the forest area, near the boundary of the early town.

Though Salamis maintained direct links with the Near East during the 8th and 7th centuries BC, there were bonds with the Aegean as well. One royal tomb contained a large amount of Greek Geometric pottery and this has been explained as the dowry of a Greek princess who married into the royal family of Salamis. Greek pottery was also found in tombs of ordinary citizens. At this time the Greeks were embarking on an eastward expansion by founding colonies in Anatolia and Syria; Salamis must have served as an intermediate station; it has even been suggested that Cypriots helped the Greeks in their venture.

=== Resistance to Persian rule ===
In 450 BC, Salamis was the site of a simultaneous land and sea battle between the Delian League and Persian Empire during the Wars of the Delian League.

The history of Salamis during the early Archaic and Classical periods is reflected in the narrations of the Greek historian Herodotus and the much later speeches of the Greek orator Isocrates. Salamis was afterwards besieged and conquered by Artaxerxes III. Under King Evagoras I (411–374 BC) Greek culture and art flourished in the city. A monument, which illustrates the end of the Classical period in Salamis, is the tumulus, which covered the cenotaph of Nicocreon, one of the last kings of Salamis, who died in 311 BC. On its monumental platform were found several clay heads, some of which are portraits, perhaps of members of the royal family who were honoured after their death on the pyre.

Marguerite Yon claims that "Literary texts and inscriptions suggest that by the Classical period, Kition was one of the principal local powers, along with its neighbor Salamis."

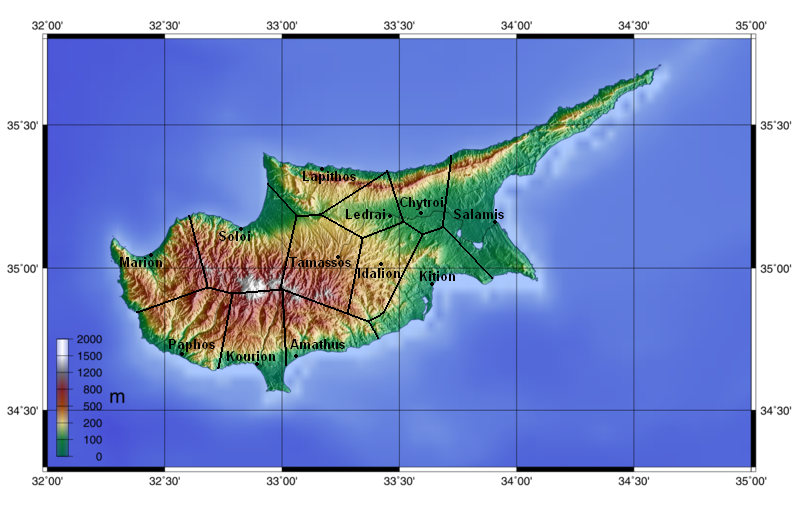
Map showing the ten ancient city Kingdoms of Cyprus

=== Alexander the Great and Ptolemaic kingdom ===
After Alexander the Great conquered the Persian Empire, Ptolemy I of Egypt ruled the island of Cyprus. He forced Nicocreon, who had been the Ptolemaic governor of the island, to commit suicide in 311 BC, because he did not trust him any more. In his place came king Menelaus, who was the brother of Ptolemy. Nicocreon is supposed to be buried in one of the big tumuli near Enkomi. Salamis remained the seat of the governor.

In 306 BC, Salamis was the site of a naval battle between the fleets of Demetrius I of Macedon and Ptolemy I of Egypt. Demetrius won the battle and captured the island.

In 58 BC, the Roman Republic annexed Cyprus; the Senate commissioned Cato the Younger to add Cyprus to the Republic's dominions. Ptolemy of Cyprus, the last Cypriotic king, committed suicide rather than surrender to Rome.

=== Roman era ===
In Roman times, Salamis was part of the Roman province of Cilicia. The seat of the governor was relocated to Nea Paphos. The town suffered heavily during the Jewish uprising of AD 116–117, when the entire Greek population of Salamis was massacred. Although Salamis ceased to be the capital of Cyprus from the Hellenistic period onwards when it was replaced by Nea Paphos, its wealth and importance did not diminish. The city was particularly favoured by the Roman emperors Trajan and Hadrian, who restored and established its public buildings.

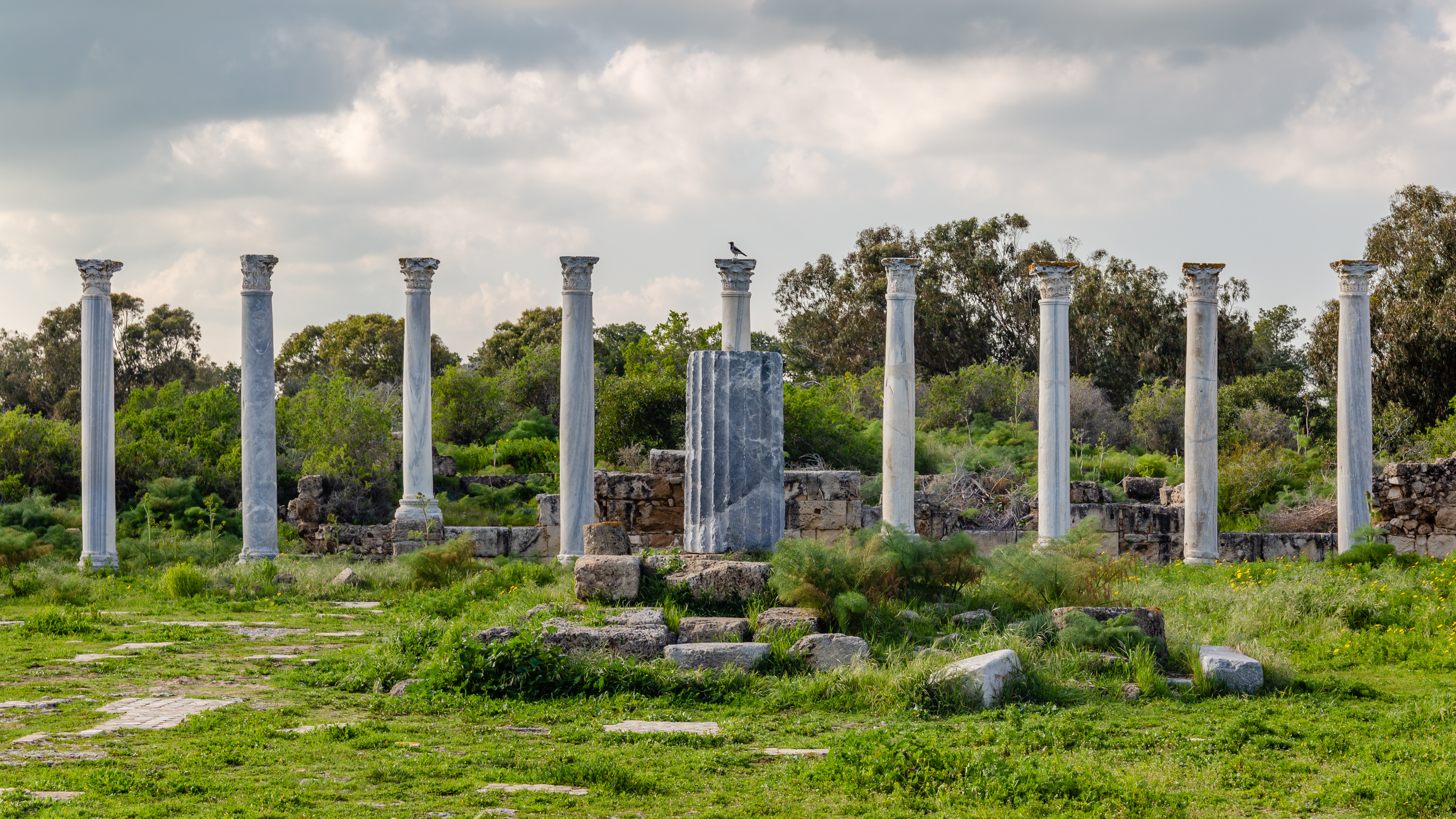
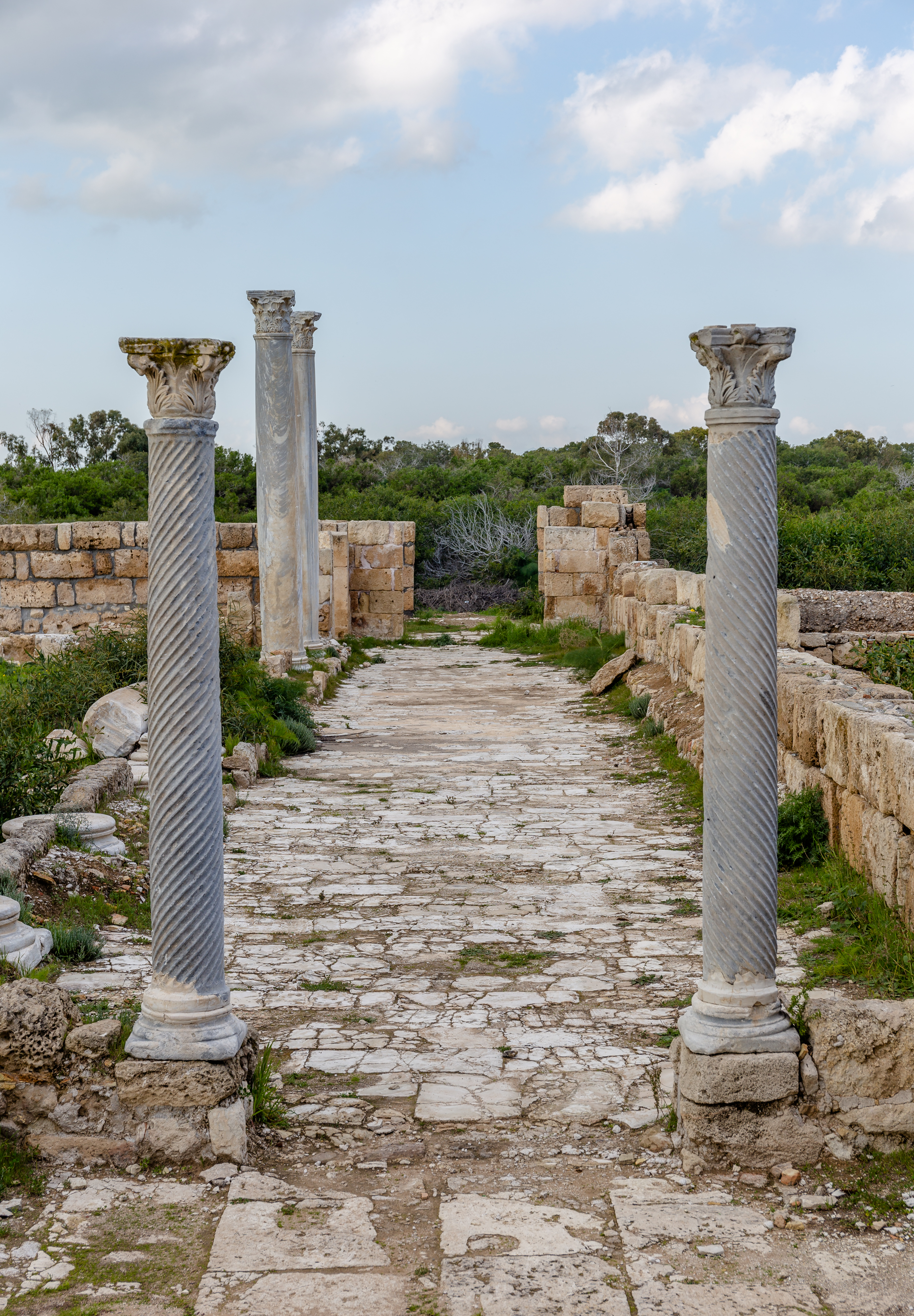
Columns of the gymnasium

The "cultural centre" of Salamis during the Roman period was situated at the northernmost part of the city, where a gymnasium, theatre, amphitheatre, stadium and public baths have been revealed. There are baths, public latrines (for 44 users), various little bits of mosaic, a harbour wall, a Hellenistic and Roman agora and a temple of Zeus that had the right to grant asylum. Byzantine remains include the basilica of Bishop Epiphanos (AD 367–403). It served as the metropolitan church of Salamis. Saint Epiphanios is buried at the southern apse. The church contains a baptistery heated by hypocausts. The church was destroyed in the 7th century and replaced by a smaller building to the south.

There are very extensive ruins. The theatre, and the gymnasium have been extensively restored. Numerous statues are displayed in the central court of the gymnasium most of which are headless. While a statue of Augustus originally belonged here, some columns and statues originally adorned the theatre and were only brought here after an earthquake in the 4th century. The theatre is of Augustean date. It could house up to 15,000 spectators but was destroyed in the 4th century.

The town was supplied with water by an aquaeduct from Kythrea, which was destroyed in the 7th century. The water was collected in a large cistern near the agora. The necropolis of Salamis covers around 7 km^{2} (2.7 sq mi) to the west of the town. It contains a museum showing some of the finds. Burials date from the geometric to the Hellenistic period. The best known burials are the so-called royal-tombs, containing chariots and extremely rich grave gifts, including imports from Egypt and Syria. A tomb excavated in 1965 by the French Mission of the University of Lyon brought to light an extraordinary wealth of tomb-gifts, which also attest trade relations with the Near East.

=== Christianity ===
In what is known as the "First Missionary Journey", Paul the Apostle and the Cypriot-born Barnabas made Salamis their first destination, landing there after heading out from Antioch of Syria. here they proclaimed Christ in the Jewish synagogues before proceeding through the rest of the island (Acts 13:1-5). Tradition says that Barnabas preached in Alexandria and Rome, and was stoned to death at Salamis around AD 61. He is considered the founder of the Church of Cyprus. His bones are believed to be located in the nearby monastery named after him.

=== Constantia ===
Several earthquakes led to the destruction of Salamis at the beginning of the 4th century. The town was rebuilt under the name Constantia by Constantius II (337–361) and became an Episcopal seat, the most famous occupant of which was Saint Epiphanius. Emperor Constantius II helped the Salaminians not only for the reconstruction of their city but also by relieving them from paying taxes for a short period. The silting of the harbour led to a gradual decline of the town.

Salamis was finally abandoned during the Arab invasions of the 7th century after destructions by Mu'awiya I (661–680). The inhabitants moved to Arsinoë (Famagusta).

== Excavations ==
Archaeological excavations at the site began in the late nineteenth century under the auspices of the Cyprus Exploration Fund. Many of these finds are now in the British Museum in London.

Excavations at Salamis started again in 1952 and were in progress until 1974. Before the Turkish invasion there was much archaeological activity there; one French Mission was excavating at Enkomi, another at Salamis and the Department of Antiquities was busy almost throughout the year with repairs and restorations of monuments and was engaged in excavations at Salamis. After the Turkish invasion the international embargo has prevented the continuation of the excavations. The site and the museums are maintained by the antiquities service. Important archaeological collections are kept in the Saint Barnabas monastery. In the District Archaeological Museum there are marble statues from the gymnasium and the theatre of Salamis, Mycenaean pottery and jewellery from Enkomi and other objects representative of the rich archaeological heritage of the whole district. Several of the statues and sculptures from antiquity are disfigured, headless or mutilated, likely by Christian zealots in late antiquity during the persecution of pagans in the late Roman Empire.

The public buildings uncovered at the city site of Salamis date to the post-Classical period. The Temple of Zeus Salaminios, whose cult was established, according to tradition, by Teucer himself, must have existed since the foundation of the city; the extant remains date to the late Hellenistic period. Early excavators discovered in the esplanade of the Temple of Zeus an enormous marble capital carved on each side with a caryatid figure standing between the foreparts of winged bulls. Now in the British Museum's collection, the function of the capital remains unclear, although it does indicate influence from Achaemenid art and is consequently dated to between 300 and 250 BC.

== See also ==
- List of ancient Greek cities
