= Marion, Cyprus =

Ancient city-kingdom of Cyprus

Marion
- Μάριον (Greek)
- Map showing the ancient city Kingdoms of Cyprus

- Location within Cyprus
- 35.0375°N 32.4333°E
- Location: Cyprus
- Region: Paphos District

Marion (Greek: Μάριον) was one of the ten city-kingdoms of Cyprus. It was situated in the north-west of the island in the Akamas region, close to or under the current town of Polis. Both Strabo and Pliny the Elder mention the city in their writings. Periplus of Pseudo-Scylax called it a Greek city.

== History ==
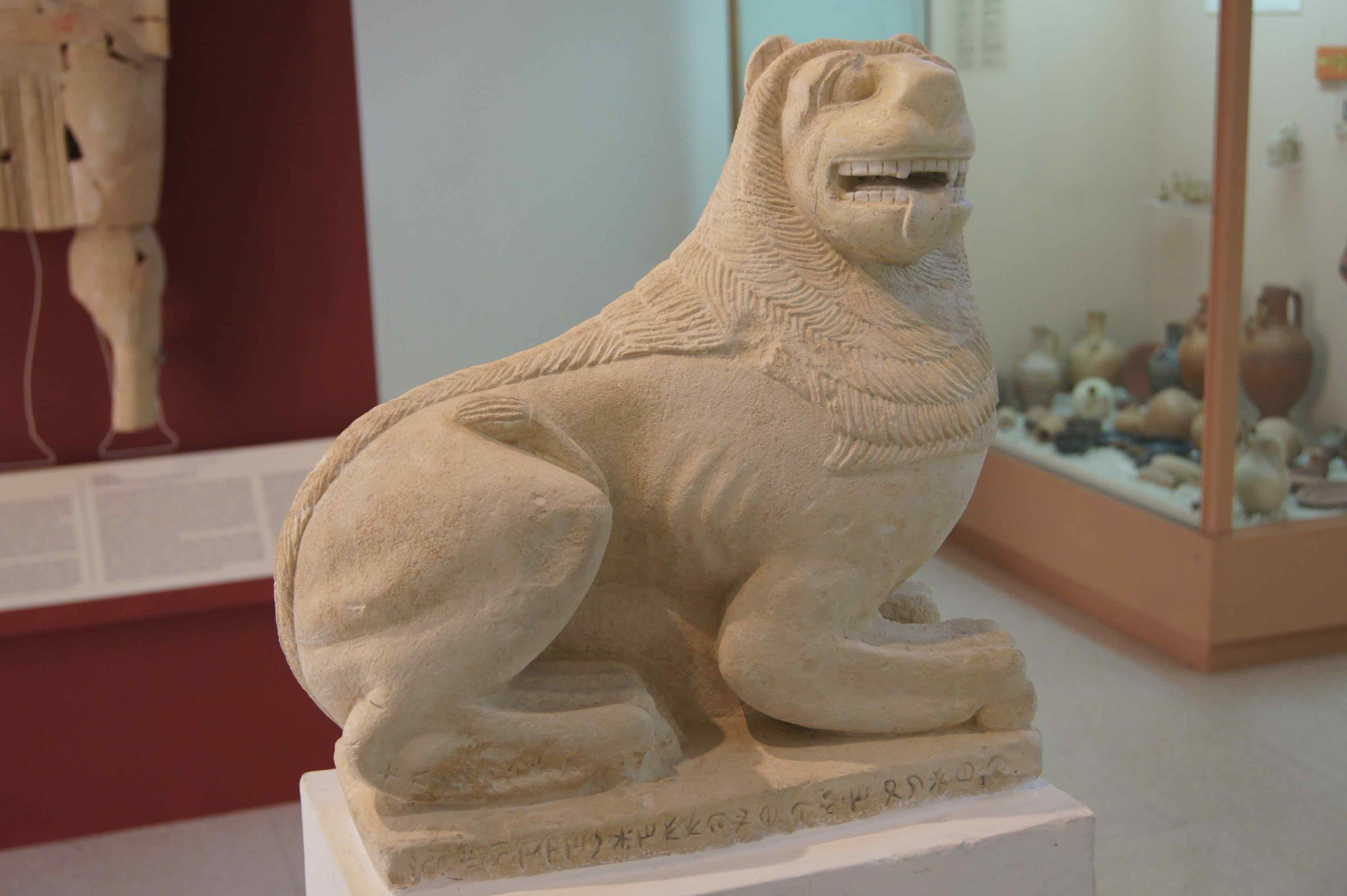
tomb sculpture from Marion, Polis Museum

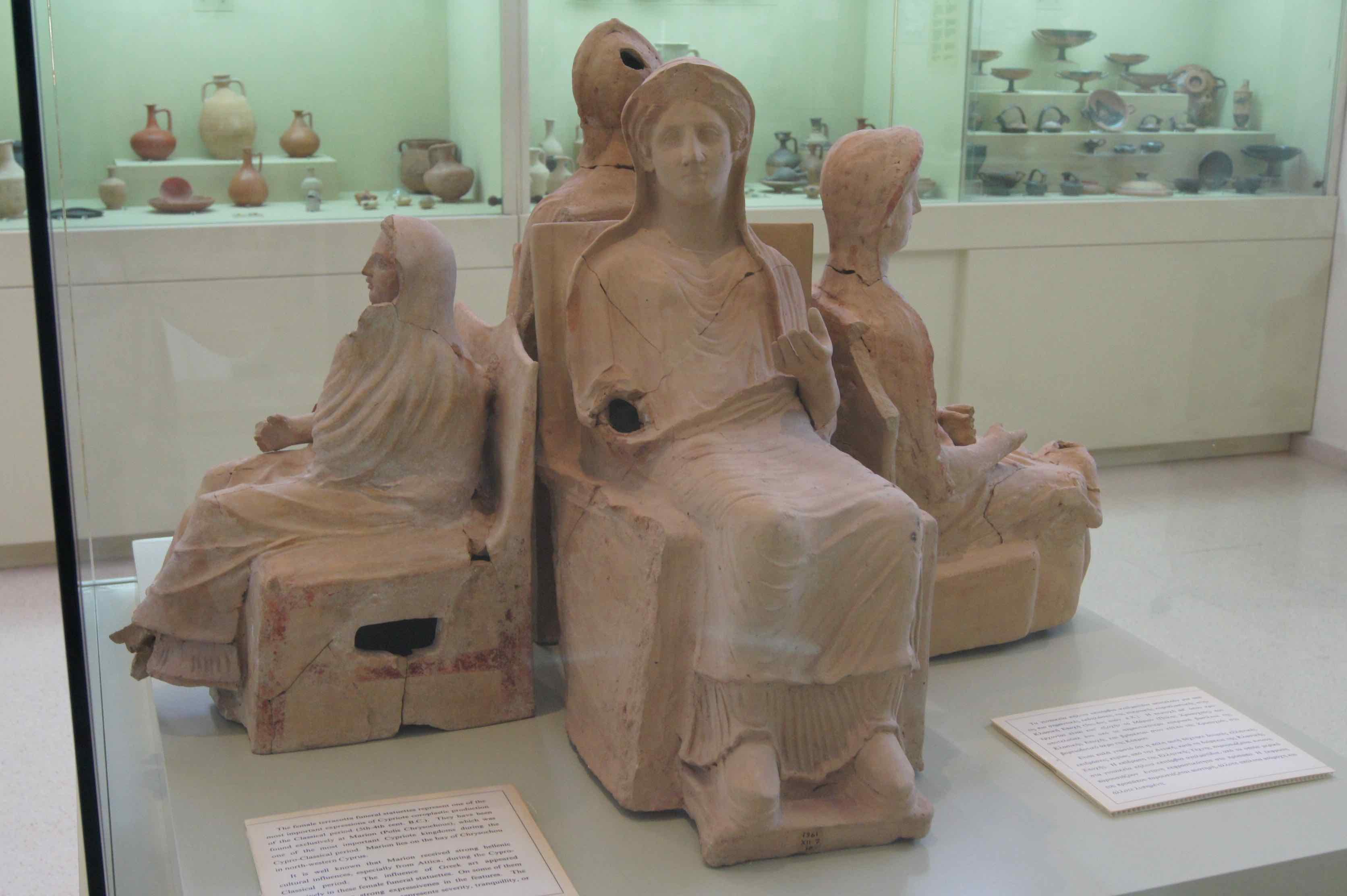
unique styles of terracottas from tomb contents, Marion, Polis Museum

Marion was already inhabited at the end of the Neolithic and through the Chalcolithic period.

According to tradition, the Athenian Acamas, son of Theseus, disembarked near Polis after the Trojan War and gave his name to the Cape of Akamas and the city of Akamantis, a legendary city which has never been found. Marion was probably founded by Acamas or a certain Marieus.

According to Stephanus of Byzantium, the city was named after a certain Marieus. Stephanus also mentions a "Marieus, son of Kinyras," whom modern scholars have identified as the city's eponymous founder.

In Egypt at Medinet Habu in the temples of Ramesses III, there is a large 12th-century BC inscription which refers to Cypriot towns including Marion.

The Mycenaeans, or Achaeans settled in Cyprus between 1400 and 1100 BC and Marion was one of the city-kingdoms they founded.

=== Iron Age ===
It began to prosper from the Cypro-Archaic period onwards and became one of the most important ancient Cypriot city—kingdoms in the Cypro-Classical period with important commercial relations with the East Aegean Islands, Attica and Corinth.

The city became wealthy from the nearby copper and gold mines. It also served as an important trading port for both metal and timber. The foundations of the ancient harbour are visible to this day in the current port of Latchi.

=== Persian/Athenian period ===
The first definite reference to Marion occurred in 449 BC when Cimon, the great Athenian general, freed the city from the Persians following the Battle of Salamis and in an attempt to re-establish Athenian supremacy in the Eastern Mediterranean.

Later, the ancient geographers spoke of the town as "Marion Hellenikon"—The Hellenic Marion. The kingdom was rich in gold and copper ore, mined chiefly in the nearby Limni Mines. It was the natural wealth which led the city to a period of flourishing trade, especially with Athens, which in its turn, exported many Attic pots to Marion.

=== Hellenistic period ===
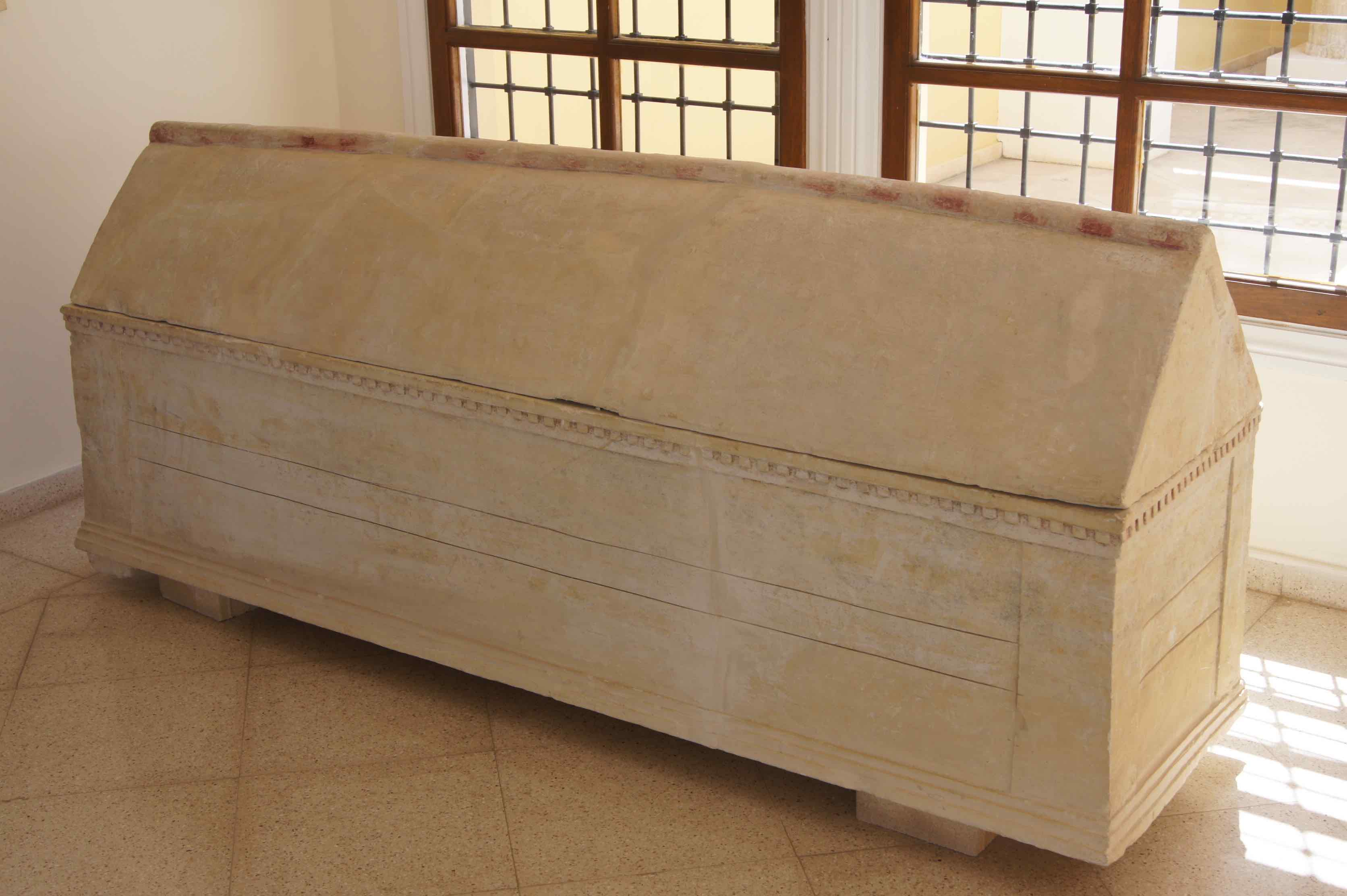
Hellenistic limestone sarcophagus from Marion, Polis Museum

The battle for Cyprus between the successors of Alexander the Great, Antigonus and Ptolemy, led to Marion's destruction in 312 BC. Ptolemy, who finally prevailed, laid waste the city whose last king (Stasioikos II) had sided with Antigonus, and transferred its inhabitants to Nea Paphos. Later, another member of the Ptolemaic dynasty, Philadelphus, founded a new city on the ruins of Marion around 270 BC and gave it the name of his wife, Arsinoe. The city, under its new name, prospered during the Hellenistic and Roman Ages.

According to Strabo there was a grove sacred to Zeus.

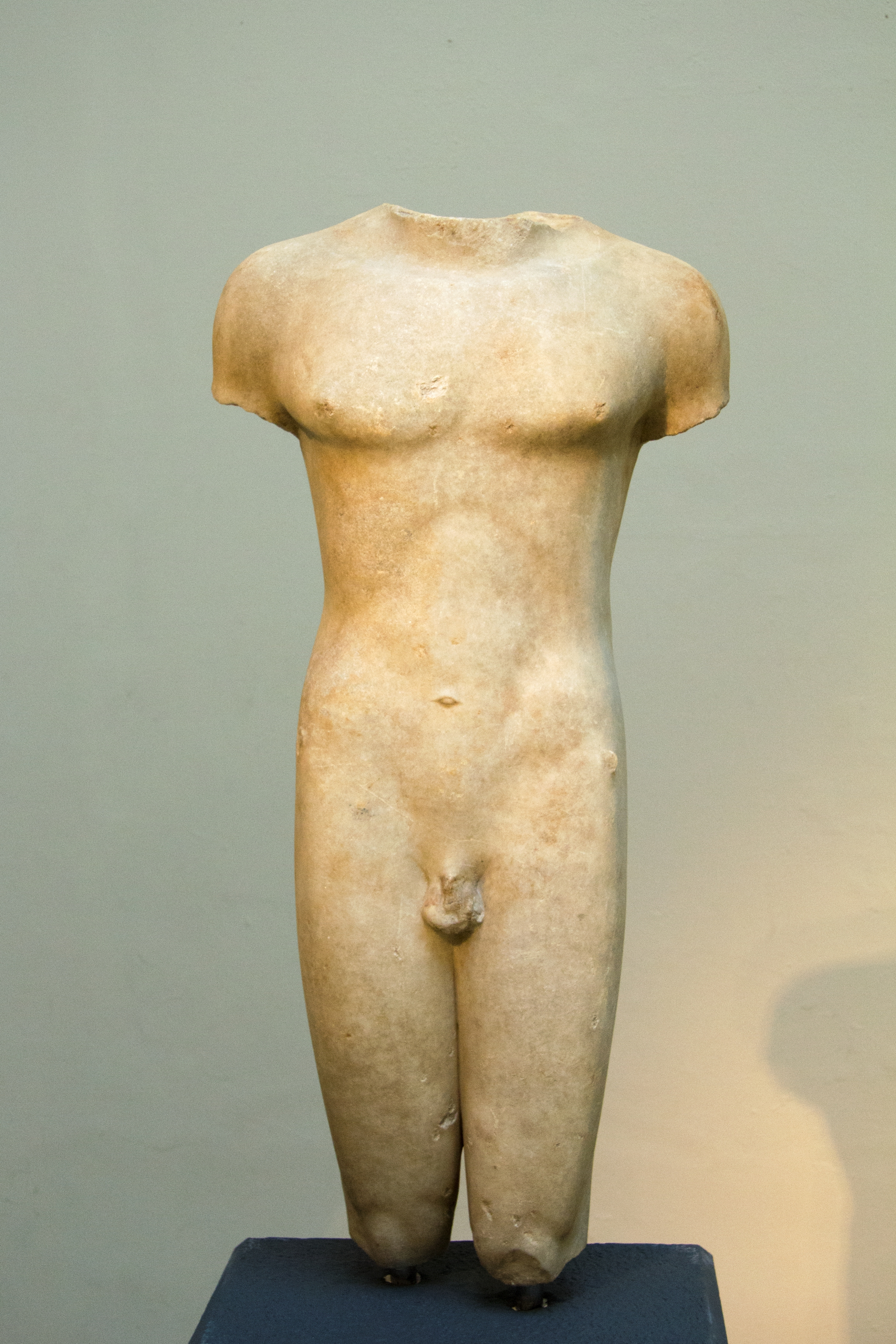
Kouros excavated from Tomb 92 in Marion now in the British Museum

== Excavations ==
Archaeological excavations of the area were first undertaken by the Swedish Cyprus Expedition between 1927 and 1931. They were followed by the Department of Antiquities of Cyprus, and since 1983 by the Princeton Cyprus Expedition.

E. Linder and A. Raban carried out the only investigation of the remains of the harbour in 1971.

Few remains of the city have been found. The sanctuary of Zeus and Aphrodite dates from the 6th to 4th centuries BC and was burnt and destroyed by the Ptolomies in 312 BC. A colossal terracotta statue found in it was likely a votive gift, and is the largest clay sculpture found on the island.

A fine marble kouros from Marion is now in the British Museum.
