= Nicocles of Paphos =

4th century BC Cypriot monarch

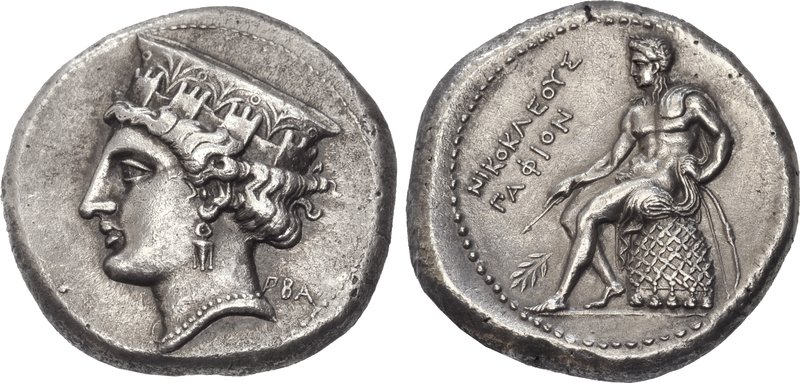
Coin of Nicocles. The obverse shows the head of Aphrodite. The reverse shows Apollo seated on the Omphalos. The Greek inscription reads ΝΙΚΟΚΛΕΟΥΣ ΠΑΦΙΟΝ (Nicocles of Paphos).

Nicocles (Greek: Νικοκλῆς; d. 306 BC) was a basileus (monarch) of Paphos, a city-state on the island of Cyprus. Nicocles moved his capital from Palaepaphos to the newly-founded city of Nea Paphos. In 321 BC, he allied himself with Ptolemy I Soter to fight against Perdiccas and Antigonus.

In 310 BC, after Ptolemy had established power over all of Cyprus, Nicocles entered into secret negotiations with Antigonus against Ptolemy. Ptolemy learned of Nicocles's treachery, had his armies surround the palace of Palaepaphos and commanded Nicocles to commit suicide. The subjugated Nicocles, with his brothers, hanged himself.

According to ancient accounts, Nicocles's wife Axiothea of Paphos killed her virgin daughters to prevent them from falling into the hands of the Macedonians. Then, together with her sisters-in-law, she set fire to the palace and died in the blaze.

== Ancient sources ==
- Isocrates, Nicocles or the Cyprians
- Diodorus Siculurs, Bibliotheca Historica (Diod. Sic. xx. 21)
- Polyaenus, Strategemata (VIII, 48)
