= Ancient history of Cyprus =

The documented history of Cyprus begins in the 8th century BC. The town of Kition, now Larnaca, recorded part of the ancient history of Cyprus on a stele that commemorated a victory by Sargon II (722–705 BC) of Assyria there in 709 BC. Assyrian domination of Cyprus (known as Iatnanna by the Assyrians) appears to have begun earlier than this, during the reign of Tiglath-Pileser III (744–727 BC), and ended with the fall of the Neo-Assyrian Empire in 609 BC, whereupon the city-kingdoms of Cyprus gained independence once more. Following a brief period of Egyptian domination in the sixth century BC, Cyprus fell under Persian rule, until the late-fourth century BC saw the overthrow of the Achaemenid Empire by Alexander the Great.

Alexander's conquests accelerated the ongoing Hellenisation of Cyprus. His premature death in 323 BC led to a period of turmoil as Ptolemy I Soter and Demetrius I of Macedon fought together for supremacy in the region, but by 294 BC, the Ptolemaic Egypt had regained control and Cyprus remained under Ptolemaic rule until 58 BC, when it came under Roman rule. During the Hellenistic period, earlier Phoenician and Eteocypriot traits weakened together with the old Cypriot syllabic script, and Cyprus became thoroughly Hellenised. In the early history of Christianity, Cyprus was the first province of the Roman Empire to be ruled by a Christian governor in the first century AD, providing a backdrop for events in the New Testament.

== Outline ==
Periods of Cyprus's ancient history from 1050 BC onward have been named according to styles of pottery as follows:

- Cypro-Geometric I: 1050–950 BC
- Cypro-Geometric II: 950–850 BC
- Cypro-Geometric III: 850–700 BC
- Cypro-Archaic I: 700–600 BC
- Cypro-Archaic II: 600–475 BC
- Cypro-Classical I: 475–400 BC
- Cypro-Classical II: 400–323 BC

== Bronze age ==
=== Egyptians, Hittites and Mycenaean Greeks ===
Pharaoh Thutmose III of Egypt subjugated Cyprus around 1450s BC and forced its inhabitants to pay tribute, which continued until Egyptian rule was replaced by the Hittites (who called Cyprus Alashiya in their language) in the 13th century BC. The Hebrews called Cyprus the Kittim Island.

The Ancient Greek historian Herodotus (5th century BC) claims that the city of Kourion, near present-day Limassol, was founded by Achaean settlers from Argos. This is further supported by the discovery of a Late Bronze Age settlement lying several kilometres from the site of the remains of the Hellenic city of Kourion, whose pottery and architecture indicate that Mycenaean settlers did indeed arrive and augment an existing population in this part of Cyprus in the twelfth century BC. The kingdom of Kourion in Cyprus is recorded on an inscription dating to the period of the Pharaoh Ramesses III (1186–1155 BC) in Egypt.

== Early history ==
=== Greek and Phoenician settlement ===
After the invasion of the Sea Peoples (c. 1200 BC), the ancient Greeks settled on the island (c. 1100 BC), acting decisively in the formation of its cultural identity.

The Phoenicians who came from Tyre, colonized some cities of Cyprus, such as Idalium, Kition, Marion, Salamis and Tamassos and founded the city of Lapathus.

=== Assyrian conquest and the ten city-kingdoms of Cyprus ===
A stele found in 1845 in Kition, commemorates the 709 BC victory of the Neo-Assyrian king Sargon II (721–705 BC) over seven kings in the land of Ia', in the district of Iadnana or Atnana. The land of Ia' is assumed to be the Assyrian name for Cyprus, and some scholars suggest that the latter may mean 'the islands of the Danaans', or Greece. There are other inscriptions referring to the land of Ia' in Sargon's palace at Khorsabad.

Ancient city-kingdoms of Cyprus

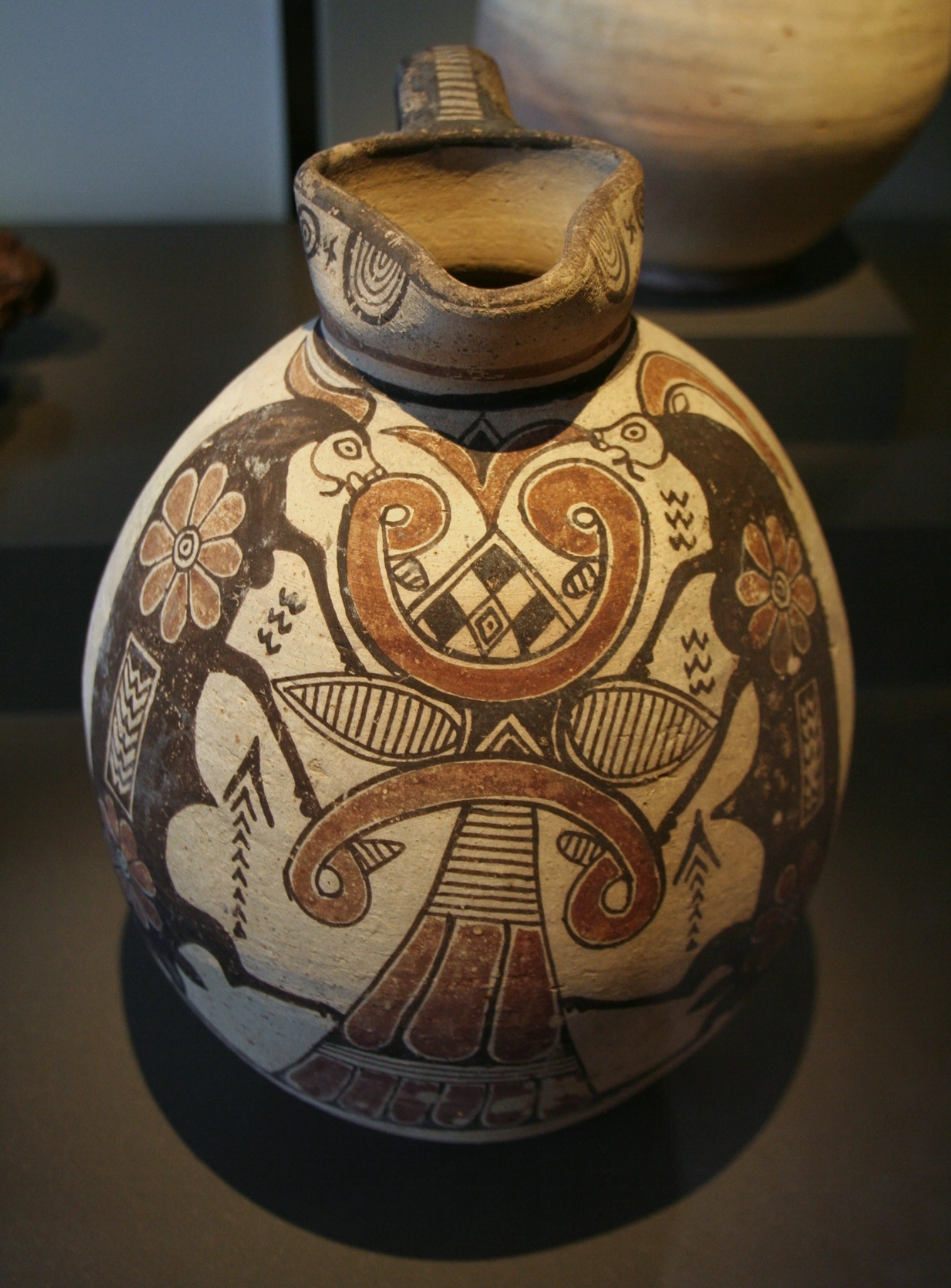
Jug with Scenic Decoration, Cyprus, 800–600 BC, Neues Museum, Berlin

The "ten city-kingdoms" listed on the prism of Esarhaddon in 673–672 BC have been identified as:

- Soli
- Salamis
- Paphos
- Kourion
- Amathus
- Kition

on the coast, and

- Tamassos
- Ledra
- Idalium
- Chytri

in the interior of the island. Later inscriptions add Marion, Lapithos and Kyrenia.

Cyprus gained independence after 627 BC following the death of Ashurbanipal, the last great Assyrian king. Cemeteries from this period are chiefly rock-cut tombs. They have been found, among other locations, at Tamassos, Soli, Patriki and Trachonas. The rock-cut 'royal' tombs at Tamassos, built c. 600 BC, imitate wooden houses. The pillars show Phoenician influence. Some graves contain the remains of horses and chariots.

The main deity of ancient Cyprus was, the Assyro-Babylonian goddess Ishtar, and Phoenician Astarte, later known by the Greek name Aphrodite. She was called "the lady of Kypros" by Homer. Paphian inscriptions call her "the Queen". Pictures of Aphrodite appear on the coins of Salamis as well, demonstrating that her cult had a larger regional influence. In addition, the King of Paphos was the High Priest of Aphrodite, and a great pilgrim temple of her, the Sanctuary of Aphrodite Paphia, was situated in Palaepaphos. Other gods venerated include the Phoenician Anat, Baal, Eshmun, Reshef, Mikal and Melkart and the Egyptian Hathor, Thoth, Bes and Ptah, as attested by amulets. Animal sacrifices are attested to on terracotta-votives. The sanctuary of Ayia Irini contained over 2,000 figurines.

== Egyptian rule ==
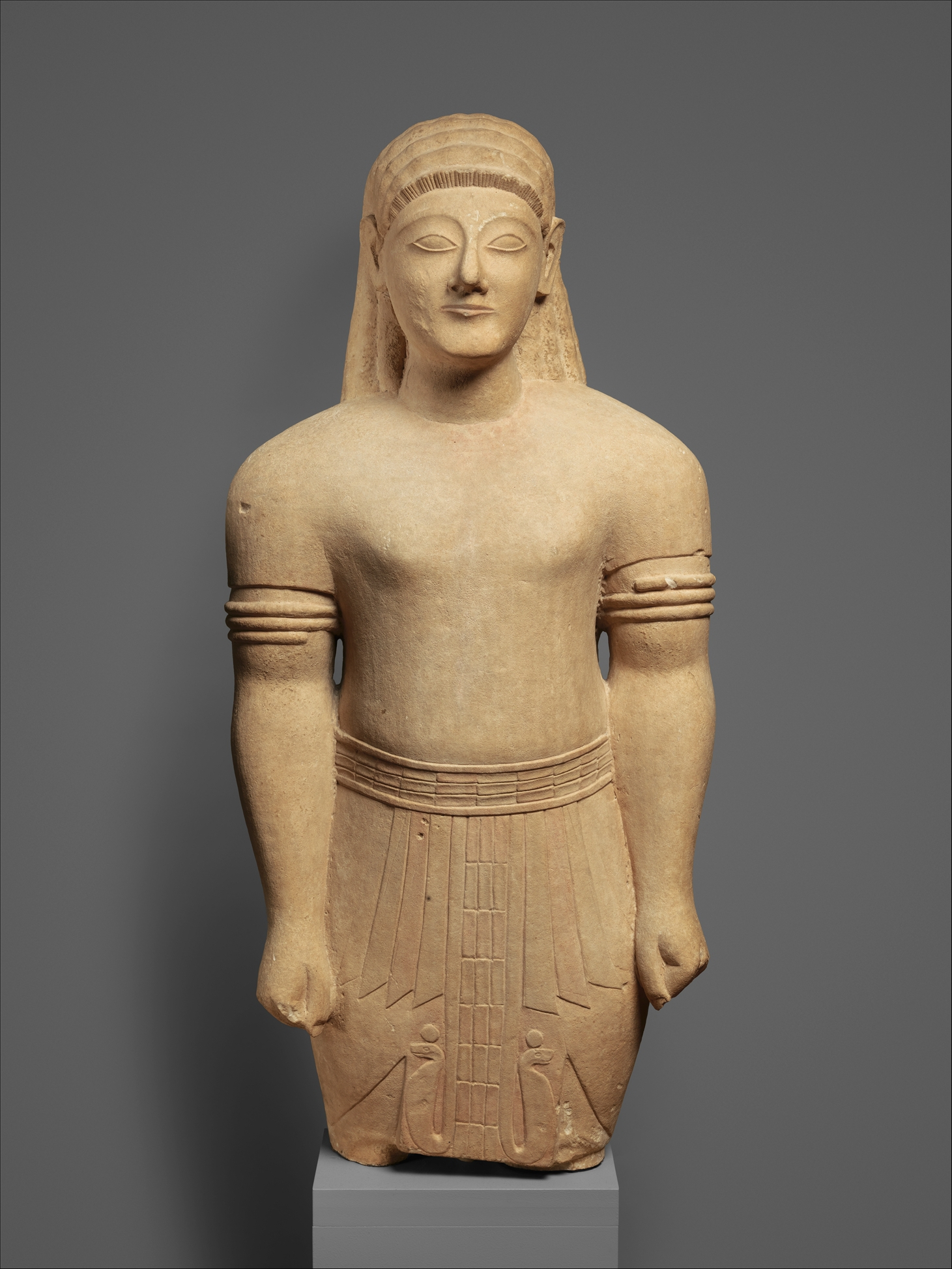
Cypriot statue of a man in Egyptian dress

In 570 BC, Cyprus was conquered by Egypt under Amasis II.

This brief period of Egyptian rule left its influence mainly in the arts, especially sculpture, where the rigidity and the dress of the Egyptian style can be observed. Cypriot artists later discarded this Egyptian style in favour of Greek prototypes. Although Egyptian rule lasted for about 25 years until 545 BC, it left a distinct imprint on Cypriot life.

Statues in stone often show a mixture of Egyptian and Greek influence. In particular, ceramics recovered on Cyprus show influence from ancient Crete. Men often wore Egyptian wigs and Assyrian-style beards. Armour and dress showed western Asiatic elements as well.

== Persian rule ==
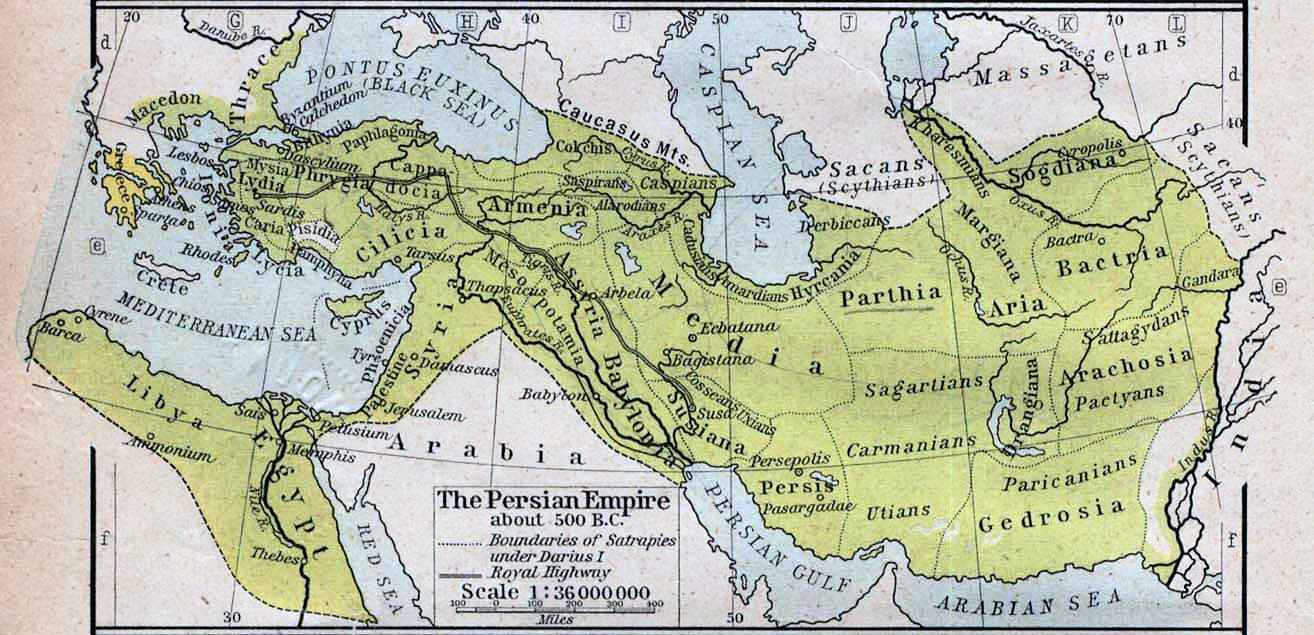
The Achaemenid Empire shown on the map at its greatest extent.

In 545 BC, the Achaemenid Empire under Cyrus the Great conquered Cyprus. Under the Persians, the Kings of Cyprus retained their independence but had to pay tribute to their overlord. The city-kingdoms began to strike their own coins in the late-sixth century BC, using the Persian weight system. Coins minted by the kings were required to have the overlord's portrait on them. King Evelthon of Salamis (560–525 BC) was probably the first to cast silver or bronze coins in Cyprus; the coins were designed with a ram on the obverse and an ankh on the reverse.

Royal palaces have been excavated in Palaepaphos and in Vouni in the territory of Marion on the north coast. They closely follow Persian examples like Persepolis. Vouni, on a hill overlooking Morphou Bay, was built around 520 BC and destroyed in 380 BC. It contained royal audience chambers (liwan), open courtyards, bathhouses and stores. Towns in Cyprus during this period were fortified with mudbrick walls on stone foundations and rectangular bastions. The houses were constructed of mud-bricks as well, whereas public buildings were faced with ashlar. The Phoenician town of Karpasia, near Rizokarpaso, had houses built of rubble masonry with square stone blocks forming the corners. Temples and sanctuaries were built mainly in a Phoenician style. Soli had a small temple with a Greek plan.

A definite influence from Greece was responsible for the production of some very important sculptures. The archaic Greek art with its attractive smile on the face of the statue is found on many Cypriot pieces dating between 525 and 475 BC; that is, the closing years of the Archaic period in Greece. During Persian rule, Ionian influence on the sculptures intensified; copies of Greek korai appear, as well as statues of men in Greek dress. Naked kouroi, however, although common in Greece, are extremely rare in Cyprus, while women (korai) are always presented dressed with rich folds in their garments. The pottery in Cyprus retained its local influences, although some Greek pottery was imported.

=== Ionian revolt ===
Except for the royal city of Amathus, the Kingdoms of Cyprus took part in the Ionian Revolt in 499 BC. The revolt on Cyprus was led by Onesilus of Salamis, brother of the King of Salamis, whom he dethroned for not wanting to fight for independence. The Persians crushed the Cypriot armies and laid siege to the fortified towns in 498 BC. Soli surrendered after a five-month siege.

The most important obligation of the kings of Cyprus to the Shah of Persia was the payment of tribute and the supply of armies and ships for his foreign campaigns. Thus, when Xerxes invaded Greece in 480 BC, Cyprus contributed 150 ships to the Persian military expedition.

=== Delian League ===
In the aftermath of the Second Persian invasion of Greece, according to Thucydides, in 478 BC the Greek allies had sailed to Cyprus and "subdued most of the island". Exactly what Thucydides means by this is unclear. Sealey suggests that this was essentially a raid to gather as much booty as possible from the Persian garrisons on Cyprus. There is no indication that the Greeks made any attempt to actually take possession of the island, and shortly after they sailed to Byzantium. Certainly, the fact that the Delian League repeatedly campaigned in Cyprus suggests that the island was not garrisoned by the Greeks in 478 BC, or that the garrisons were quickly expelled.

In c. 460 BC a Delian League fleet was campaigning in Cyprus, before being instructed to head to Egypt to support Inaros's rebellion. The Egyptian disaster would eventually lead the Athenians to sign a five-year truce with Sparta in 451 BC. Thereby freed from fighting in Greece, the league was again able to dispatch a fleet to campaign in Cyprus in 451 BC, under the recently recalled Cimon.Cimon sailed for Cyprus with a fleet of 200 ships provided by the Athenians and their allies. However, 60 of these ships were sent to Egypt at the request of Amyrtaeus, the so-called "King of the Marshes" (who still remained independent of, and opposed to Persian rule). The rest of the force besieged Kition in Cyprus, but during the siege, Cimon died either of sickness or a wound. The Athenians lacked provisions, and apparently under the death-bed instructions of Cimon, the Athenians retreated towards Salamis-in-Cyprus.

Cimon's death was kept a secret from the Athenian army. 30 days after leaving Kition, the Athenians and their allies were attacked by a Persian force composed of Cilicians, Phoenicians, and Cyprians, whilst sailing off Salamis-in-Cyprus. Under the 'command' of the deceased Cimon, they defeated this force at sea, and also in a land battle. Having thus successfully extricated themselves, the Athenians sailed back to Greece, joined by the detachment which had been sent to Egypt. These battles formed the end of the Greco-Persian Wars.

=== Evagoras I of Salamis ===
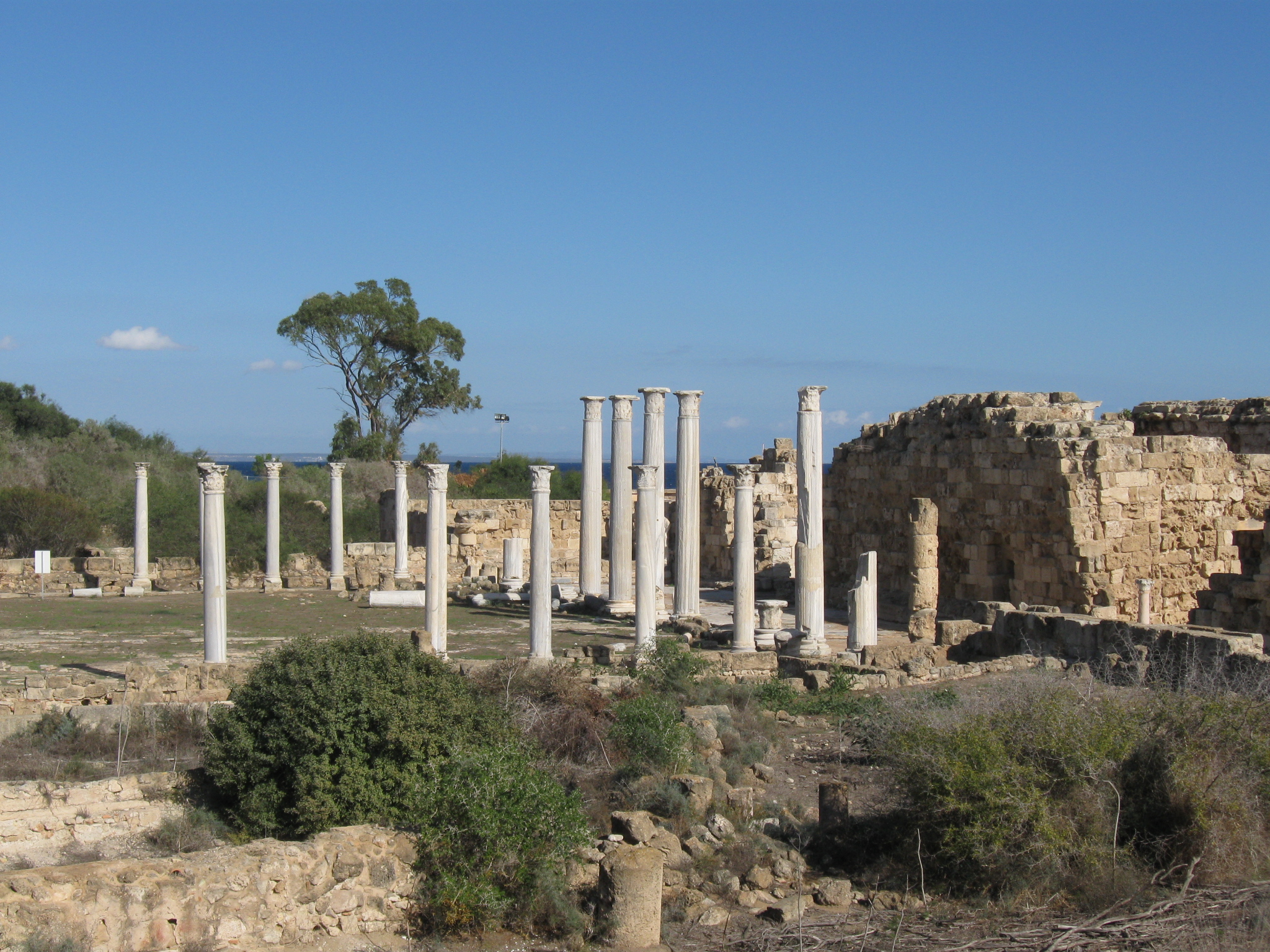
The ruins of Salamis-in-Cyprus

Evagoras I of Salamis (435–374 BC) dominated Cypriot politics for almost forty years until his death in 374 BC. He had favoured Athens during the closing years of the Peloponnesian War, elicited Persian support for the Athenians against Sparta and urged Greeks from the Aegean to settle in Cyprus, assisting the Athenians in so many ways that they honoured him by erecting his statue in the Stoa Basileios in Athens. At the beginning of the 4th century BC, he took control of the whole island of Cyprus and within a few years was attempting to gain independence from Persia with Athenian help.

Following resistance from the kings of Kition, Amathus and Soli, who fled to the great king of Persia in 390 BC to request support, Evagoras received less help from the Athenians than he had hoped for and in c. 380 BC, a Persian force besieged Salamis and Evagoras was forced to surrender. In the end, he remained king of Salamis until he was murdered in 374 BC, but only by accepting his role as a vassal of Persia.

Evagoras I of Salamis introduced the Greek alphabet to Cyprus. In other parts of the island, the Phoenician script (Kition) or the Cypriot syllabic alphabet were still used. Together with Egypt and Phoenicia, Cyprus rebelled against Persian rule again in 350 BC, but the uprising was crushed by Artaxerxes III in 344 BC.

=== Cyprus under Alexander the Great ===
Long and sustained efforts to overthrow Persian rule proved unsuccessful and Cyprus remained a vassal of the Persian Empire until the Persians' defeat by Alexander the Great. The various kingdoms of Cyprus became allies of Alexander following his victorious campaigns at Granicus (334 BC), Issus (333 BC) and on the coast of Anatolia, Syria and Phoenicia, where Persian naval bases were situated. The Cypriot kings, learning of the victory of Alexander at Issus, and knowing that sooner or later, Alexander would be the new ruler of the island, since the occupation of Cyprus was necessary (along with that of Phoenicia) to open lines of communication to Egypt and Asia, rose up against their Persian overlords and made the ships formerly in the service of Persia available to the fleet of Alexander. Through Alexander the Cypriot kings achieved political independence.

In Phoenicia, only Tyre resisted Alexander's control, and so he undertook a siege. The Cypriot fleet, together with Cypriot engineers, contributed much to the capture of this highly fortified city. King Pnytagoras of Salamis, Androcles of Amathus, and Pasikratis of Soli, personally took part in the siege of Tyre. Tyre, then the most important Phoenician city, was built on a small island that was 700 metres (2,300 ft) from the shore and had two harbors, the Egyptian to the south and Sidonian to the north. The Cypriot kings, in command of 120 ships, each with a very experienced crew, provided substantial assistance to Alexander's navy in the siege of the city, which lasted for seven months. During the final attack, the Cypriots occupied the Sidonian harbour and the northern part of Tyre, while the Phoenicians loyal to Alexander occupied the Egyptian harbour. Alexander also attacked the city with siege engines by constructing a "mole", a strip of soil from the coast opposite Tyre, to the island where the city was built. In this operation, Alexander was helped by many Cypriot and Phoenician engineers who built earthworks on his behalf. Many siege engines battered the city from the "mole" and from "ippagoga" ships.

Although they lost many quinqueremes, the Cypriots helped capture the city for Alexander. His gratitude was shown, for example, by the help he gave to Pnytagora, who seems to have been the main driver of this initiative to support Alexander, to incorporate the territory of the Cypriot kingdom of Tamassos into that of Salamis. The kingdom of Tamassos was then ruled by King Poumiaton of Kition who had purchased it for 50 talents from King Pasikypro. In 331 BC, while Alexander was returning from Egypt, he stayed for a while in Tyre, where the Cypriot kings, wishing to reaffirm their trust and support for him, put on a great show of honour. Cypriot ships were also sent to help Alexander's admiral Amphoterus.

Cyprus was an experienced seafaring nation and Alexander used the Cypriot fleet during his campaign into India; because the country had many navigable rivers, he included a significant number of shipbuilders and rowers from Cyprus, Egypt, Phoenicia and Caria in his military expedition. Cypriot forces were led by Cypriot princes such as Nikoklis, son of King Pasikrati of Solon, and Nifothona, son of King Pnytagora of Salamis. As Alexander took over control of the administrative region that had been the Persian Empire, he promoted Cypriots to high office and great responsibility; in particular, Stasanor of Soli was appointed satrap of the Supreme Court and Drangon in 329 BC and Stasander who was also from Soli appointed satrap of Aria and Drangiana. The hope of full independence for Cyprus following the fall of the Persian Empire, however, was slow to be realized. The mints of Salamis, Kition and Paphos began to stamp coins on Alexander's behalf rather than in the name of the local kings. The policy of Alexander the Great on Cyprus and its kings soon became clear: to free them from Persian rule but to put them under his own authority. Away from the coast of Cyprus, the interior kingdoms were left largely independent and the kings maintained their autonomy, although not in issues such as mining rights. Alexander sought to make it clear that he considered himself the master of the island, and abolished the currencies of the Cypriot kingdoms, replacing them with his own coins.

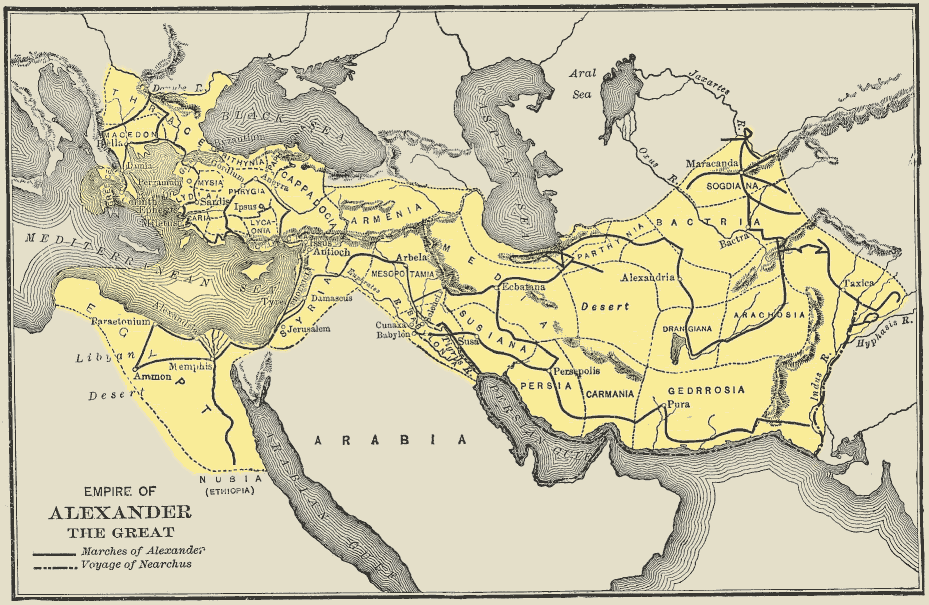
Map of Alexander's empire.

== Hellenistic period ==
After the death of Alexander the Great in 323 BC, his empire was divided between his generals and successors, who immediately started fighting one another. The death of Alexander the Great marks the beginning of the Hellenistic period of Cypriot history. After the death of Alexander the Great, Cyprus passed on to Ptolemaic rule. Still under Greek influence, Cyprus gained full access to the Greek culture and thus became fully hellenised.

=== Cyprus contested between Ptolemies and Antigonids ===
The wars of Alexander's successors inevitably began to involve Cyprus, and focused on two claimants, Antigonus Monophthalmus in Syria (assisted by his son Demetrius Poliorcetes) and Ptolemy Lagus in Egypt. The Cypriot kings who, so far, had largely managed to maintain their kingdoms' independence, found themselves in a new and difficult position. As Cyprus became the focus of discord between Ptolemy and Antigonus, the kings of the island now had to make new choices and alliances. The largest city and kingdom of Cyprus then appears to have been Salamis, whose king was Nicocreon. Nicocreon strongly supported Ptolemy. According to Arrian, he had the support of Pasikratis of Solon, Nikoklis of Paphos and Androcles of Amathus. Other kings of Cyprus, however, including Praxippos of Lapithos and Kyrenia, the Poumiaton (Pygmalion) of Kition and Stasioikos of Marion, allied themselves with Antigonus. Some kings chose to remain neutral. Against these, Nicocreon and other pro-Ptolemaic kings conducted military operations. Ptolemy sent military support to his allies, providing troops under the command of Seleucus and Menelaus. Lapithos-Kyrenia was occupied after a siege and Marion capitulated. Diodorus Siculus tells us that Amathus was forced to provide hostages, while Kition was laid siege to in about 315 BC.

Ptolemy entered Cyprus with further military forces in 312 BC, captured and killed the king of Kition and arrested the pro-Antigonid kings of Marion and Lapithos-Kyrenia. He destroyed the city of Marion and annulled most of the former kingdoms of Cyprus. This crucial and decisive intervention by Ptolemy in 312 BC gave more power to the kings of Solon and Paphos, and particularly to Nicocreon of Salamis, whom Ptolemy seems to have appreciated and trusted completely and who won the cities and the wealth of expelled kings. Salamis extended its authority throughout eastern, central and northern Cyprus, since Kition and Lapithos were absorbed into it and Tamassos already belonged to it. Furthermore, Nicocreon took office as chief general in Cyprus with the blessing of Ptolemy, effectively making him master of the whole island. But the situation was fluid and the rulers of Soli and Paphos had been kept in power. Soon, King Nicocles of Paphos was considered suspect; in 312 BC he was besieged and forced to suicide, and his entire family was put to death. The following year Nicocreon of Salamis died. After the intervention of Ptolemy in Cyprus, which subjugated the island, Antigonus Monophthalmus and his son Demetrius Poliorcetes reacted against the besiegers and Demetrius led a large military operation in Cyprus.

Demetrius (born in 336 BC) initially fought under the command of his father in 317 BC against Eumenes, where he particularly distinguished himself. In 307 BC he liberated Athens, restoring democracy there and in 306 BC, led the war against the Ptolemies. Wishing to use Cyprus as a base for attacks against Western Asia, he sailed from Cilicia to Cyprus with a large infantry force, cavalry and naval ships. Meeting no resistance, he landed on the Karpas Peninsula and occupied the cities Urania and Karpasia. Meanwhile, Menelaus, brother of Ptolemy and the new general of the island, gathered his forces at Salamis. Ptolemy arrived to aid his brother, but was decisively defeated at the Battle of Salamis, after which Cyprus came under Antigonid control. Antigonus was killed in the Battle of Ipsus in 301 BC and Demetrius, having reorganized the army, was proclaimed King of Macedon, but was evicted by Lysimachus and Pyrrhus.

=== Ptolemaic Cyprus ===
Cyprus came once again under Ptolemaic control in 294 BC and mostly remained under Ptolemaic rule until 58 BC, when it became a Roman province. It was ruled by a series of governors sent from Alexandria and sometimes formed a minor Ptolemaic kingdom during the power struggles of the 2nd and 1st centuries BC. Also, the Seleucid Empire briefly took the island over during the Sixth Syrian War, but gave the island back as part of a treaty arranged by the Romans. During this time, Cyprus forged strong commercial relationships with Athens and Alexandria, two of the most important commercial centres of antiquity.

Full Hellenization of Cyprus took place under Ptolemaic rule. During this period, the Eteocypriot and Phoenician languages disappeared, together with the old Cypriot syllabary, which was replaced by the Greek alphabet. A number of cities were founded during this time. For example, Arsinoe was founded between Old Paphos (Palaepaphos) and New Paphos (Nea Paphos) by Ptolemy II. Ptolemaic rule was rigid and exploited the island's resources to the utmost, particularly timber and copper. A great contemporary figure of Cypriot letters was the philosopher Zeno of Citium who was born at Kition about 336 BC and founded the Stoic School of Philosophy at Athens, where he died around 263 BC.

Cyprus came under Roman rule in 58 BC. According to Strabo, this came about, because Publius Clodius Pulcher held a grudge against Ptolemy of Cyprus. The renowned Stoic and strict constitutionalist Cato the Younger was sent to annex Cyprus and organize it under Roman law. Cato was relentless in protecting Cyprus against the rapacious tax farmers that normally plagued the provinces of the republican period. After the civil wars that ended the Roman Republic, Mark Antony gave the island, to Cleopatra of Egypt and their daughter Cleopatra Selene (both of the Ptolemaic dynasty), but it became a Roman province again after his defeat at the Battle of Actium in 31 BC.

== Roman period ==
From 22 BC onwards, Cyprus was a senatorial province "divided into four districts centred around Paphus, Salamis, Amathus and Lapethus." After the reforms of Diocletian it was placed under the Diocese of Oriens. The Pax Romana (Roman peace) was only twice disturbed in Cyprus in three centuries of Roman rule. The first serious interruption occurred in 115–116, when a Jewish revolt inspired by messianic hopes broke out. Their leader was Artemion, a Jew with a Hellenised name, as was the practice of the time. The island suffered great losses in this war; it is believed that 240,000 Greek and Roman civilians were killed. Although this number may be exaggerated, there were few or no Roman troops stationed on the island to suppress the insurrection as the rebels wreaked havoc. After forces were sent to Cyprus and the uprising was put down, a law was passed that no Jews were permitted to land on Cyprian soil, even in cases of shipwreck.

Turmoil sprang up two centuries later in 333–334, when a local official, Calocaerus revolted against Constantine I. This rebellion ended with the arrival of troops led by Flavius Dalmatius and the death of Calocaerus.

=== Olive oil trade in the late Roman period ===
Olive oil was a very important part of daily life in the Mediterranean in the Roman period. It was used for food, as a fuel for lamps, and as a basic ingredient in things like medicinal ointment, bath oils, skin oils, soaps, perfumes and cosmetics. Even before the Roman period, Cyprus was known for its olive oil, as indicated by Strabo when he said that "in fertility Cyprus is not inferior to any one of the islands, for it produces both good wine and good oil".

There is evidence for both a local trade of Cypriot oil and for a larger trading network that may have reached as far as the Aegean, although most Cypriot oil was probably limited to the Eastern Mediterranean. Many olive oil presses have been found on Cyprus, and not just in rural areas, where they might be expected for personal, local use. They have been found in some of the larger coastal cities as well, including Paphos, Curium and Amathus. In Alexandria, there is a large presence of a type of amphora made in Cyprus known as Late Roman 1 or LR1 that was used to carry oil. This indicates that a lot of Cypriot oil was being imported to Egypt. There is also evidence for Cypriot trade with Cilicia and Syria.

Olive oil was also traded locally, around the island. Amphorae found at Alaminos-Latourou Chiftlik and Dreamer's Bay, indicate that the oil produced in these areas was mostly used locally or shipped to nearby towns. The amphora found on a contemporary shipwreck at Cape Zevgari indicate that the vessel, a typical small merchant ship, was carrying oil and there is evidence from the location of the wreck and the ship itself that it was traveling a short distance, probably west around the island.

=== Christianity ===
Roman Cyprus was visited by the apostles Paul, Barnabas and St. Mark, who came to the island at the beginning of their first missionary journey in 45 AD, according to Christian tradition, converting the people of Cyprus to Christianity and founding the Church of Cyprus. After their arrival in Salamis, they proceeded to Paphos where they converted the Roman governor Sergius Paulus. In the New Testament book, Acts of the Apostles, author St. Luke describes how a Jewish magician named Elymas was obstructing the Apostles in their preaching of the Gospel. Paul rebuked him, announcing that he would temporarily become blind due to God's judgment. Paul's prediction immediately came true. As a result of this, Sergius Paulus became a believer, being astonished at the teaching of the Lord. In this way.

Paul is credited with underpinning claims for ecclesiastical independence from Antioch. At least three Cypriot bishops (the sees of Salamis, Tremithus, and Paphos) took part in the First Council of Nicaea in 325, and twelve Cypriot bishops were present at the Council of Serdica in 344. Early Cypriot saints include: Heracleidius, Spyridon, Hilarion and Epiphanius.

Several earthquakes led to the destruction of Salamis at the beginning of the 4th century, at the same time drought and famine hit the island.

In 431, the Church of Cyprus achieved its independence from the Patriarch of Antioch at the First Council of Ephesus. Emperor Zeno granted the archbishop of Cyprus the right to carry a sceptre instead of a pastoral staff.

== See also ==
- List of earthquakes in Cyprus
- Pottery of ancient Cyprus
- Ancient Cypriot art
