= Clearchus of Soli =

4th-century BC Greek philosopher

Clearchus of Soli (Greek: Kλέαρχoς ὁ Σολεύς, Klearkhos ho Soleus) was a Greek philosopher of the 4th–3rd century BCE, belonging to Aristotle's Peripatetic school. He was born in Soli in Cyprus.

He wrote extensively on eastern cultures, and is thought to have traveled to the Bactrian city of Ai-Khanoum (Alexandria on the Oxus) in modern Afghanistan.

== Writings ==
Clearchus wrote extensively around 320 BCE on Oriental cultures, from Israel to Persia to India, and several fragments from him are known. His book "Of Education" (Greek: Περὶ παιδείας, Peri paideiās) was cited by Diogenes Laërtius.

Clearchus in particular expressed several theories on the connection between western and eastern religions. In "Of Education", he wrote that "the gymnosophists are descendants of the Magi".

In another text, Josephus the first-century Romano-Jewish scholar claimed that Clearchus has reported a dialogue with Aristotle, where the philosopher states that the Hebrews were descendants of the Indian philosophers:

Jews are derived from the Indian philosophers; they are named by the Indians Calami, and by the Syrians Judaei, and took their name from the country they inhabit, which is called Judea; but for the name of their city, it is a very awkward one, for they call it Jerusalem.

— Josephus, Contra Apionem, I, 22.

His works included also:

- Βίοι (Bioi); a work on the right way of life, in at least eight volumes
- A commentary on Plato's Timaeus
- Πλάτωνος ἐγκώμιον (Platōnos enkōmion); eulogy to Plato
- Περὶ τῶν ἐν τῇ Πλάτωνος Πολιτείᾳ μαϑηματικῶς ἐιρημένων (Peri tōn en tē Platōnos Polīteiā mathēmatikōs eirēmenōn); on the mathematical subjects in Plato's Republic
- Γεργίϑιος (Gergithios); a treatise on flattery
- Περὶ φιλίας (Peri filiās); on friendship
- Παροιμίαι (Paroimiai); proverbs
- Περὶ γρίφων (Peri griphōn); on riddles
- Ἐρωτικά (Erōtika); a probably historical collection of love-stories with some very odd questions on the subject
- Περὶ γραφῶν (Peri graphōn); on paintings
- Περιγραφαί (Perigraphai); ? the reading in Athenaeus is doubtful (XIV 648f)
- Περὶ νάρκης (Peri narkēs); on the electric ray
- Περὶ τῶν ἐνύδρων (Peri tōn enudrōn); on water-animals
- Περὶ ϑινῶν (Peri thīnōn); on sand-wastes
- Περὶ σκελετῶν (Peri skeletōn); an anatomical work
- Περὶ ὕπνου (Peri upnou); on sleep (genuineness questionable)

There is some question as to whether the work on military tactics cited by Aelianus Tacticus should be ascribed to Clearchus of Soli or Clearchus of Heraclea.

== Travels ==
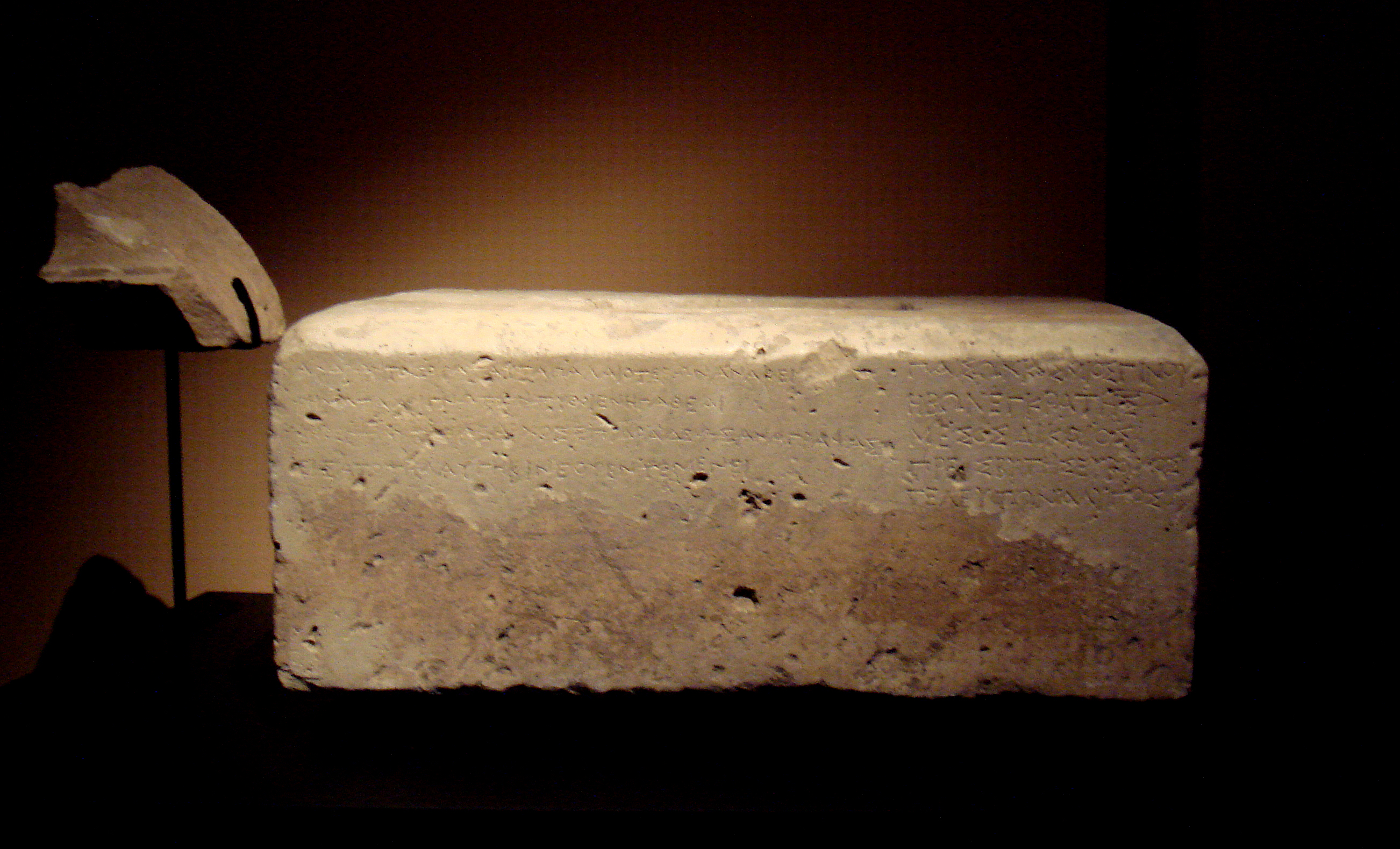
Stone block with the inscriptions of Clearchus of Soli. Ai-Khanoum, 2nd century BC.

In the Bactrian city of Ai-Khanoum, near the border with India, Greek verses, brought to city by Clearchus from Delphi, were dedicated to the founder of the city named Kineas. On a Herôon (funerary monument), identified in Greek as the tomb of Kineas (also described as the oikistes (founder) of the Greek settlement) and dated to 300-250 BC, the inscription says:

As children, learn good manners.
As young men, learn to control the passions.
In middle age, be just.
In old age, give good advice.
Then die, without regret.

— (Ai Khanoum inscription)

The precepts were placed by a Greek named Clearchus, thought to be Clearchus of Soli, who had copied them from Delphi:

Whence Klearchos, having copied them carefully, set them up, shining from afar, in the sanctuary of Kineas

— (Ai Khanoum inscription)

Clearchus of Soli was a contemporary and compatriot of Stasanor (born in the same city of Soli, in Cyprus), who was a general of Alexander the Great and later satrap of Bactria and Sogdiana.
