= Stasanor =

Ancient Cypriot general

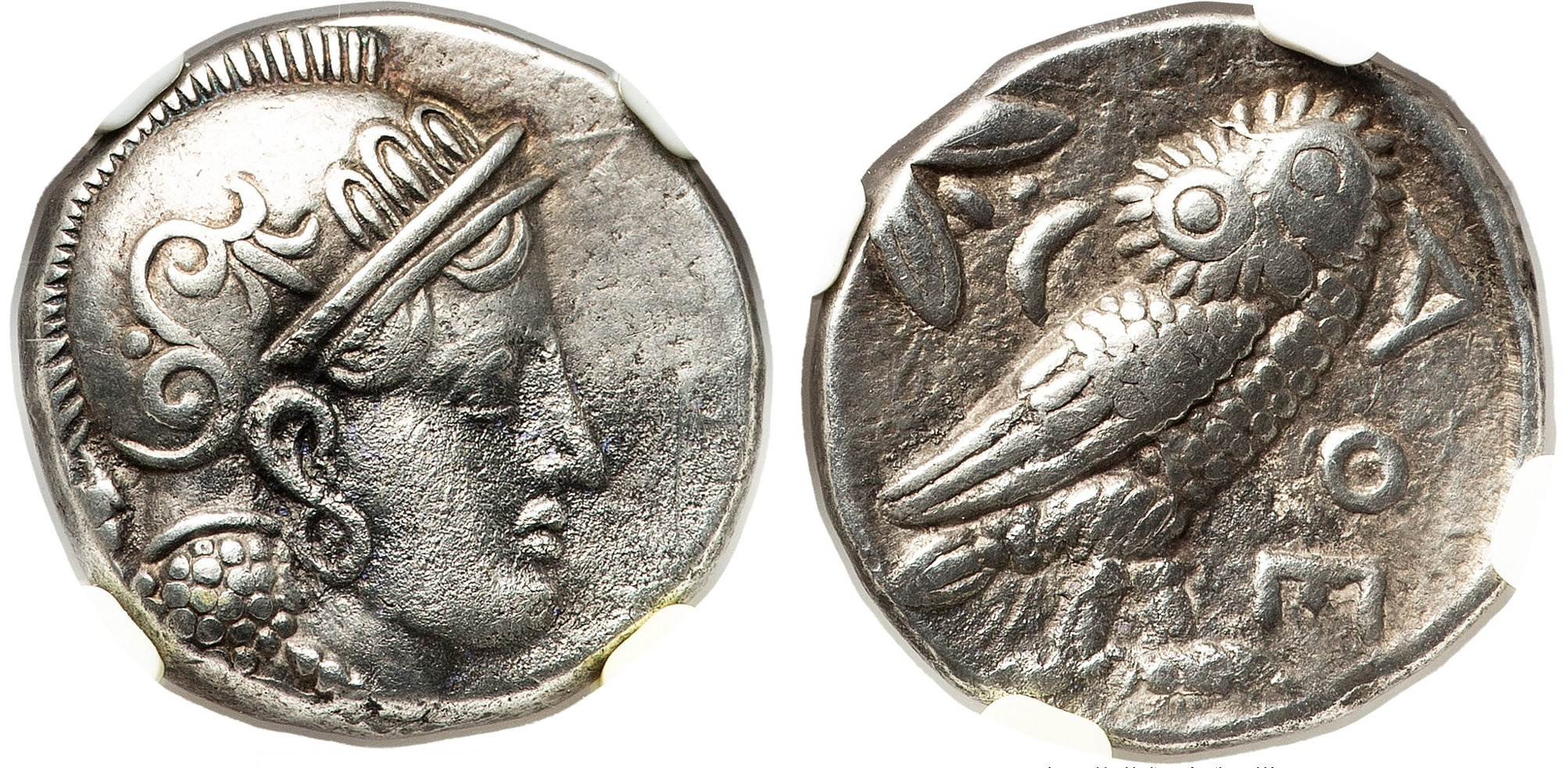
- Silver didrachm of the Bactrian "Athenian Series" imitating Athenian owls, ca. 321 BC, possibly struck under the satrap Stasanor.

Satrap of Aria and Drangiana
- Reign: 329–320 BC (Note: Aria from 329 BC; Drangiana added in the winter of 328/7 BC.)
- Predecessor: Arsaces (Aria); Arsames (Drangiana)
- Successor: Stasander

Satrap of Bactria and Sogdiana
- Reign: 320 – after 316 BC
- Predecessor: Philip
- Successor: Unknown; region conquered by Seleucus I Nicator c. 308–305 BC

Satrap of Parthia?
- Reign: After 316 BC (conjectural) (Note: The attribution rests on Bevan's interpretation of Justin 41.4.1, on which the Parthian satrapy, vacant after the murder of Philip and the expulsion of Eudamus, passed in practice under Stasanor's Bactrian governorship; the reading is conjectural and not universally accepted.)
- Predecessor: Eudamus (expelled)
- Successor: —
- Born: Soli, Cyprus
- Died: After 316 BC
- Father: Pasicrates? (conjectural) (Note: No ancient source records Stasanor's parentage. The filiation from Pasicrates, king of Soli, is a modern conjecture from Stasanor's prominence, first advanced in the nineteenth century; most scholars who accept it make him Pasicrates' son, though Schiff proposed a brother. See van Oppen de Ruiter 2015, pp. 459–460, for the state of the question, and Stoyanov 2016, pp. 100–108, for systematic criticism of the hypothesis.)

Stasanor (Ancient Greek: Στασάνωρ; fl. 4th century BC) was a Cypriot Greek from Soli who served among the hetairoi of Alexander the Great and rose to govern several of the eastern satrapies of his empire. Appointed satrap of Aria in 329 BC, with Drangiana added to his command in the winter of 328/327, he was transferred at the Partition of Triparadisus (320 BC) to the great frontier satrapy of Bactria and Sogdiana. There he remained through the Wars of the Diadochi; after the defeat of Eumenes in 316 BC, Antigonus Monophthalmus left him in possession of his province, judging that he could not be removed without a major expedition on account of the remoteness of his satrapy and the goodwill he had won among its inhabitants. He is last attested in that year.

The date and circumstances of Stasanor's death are unknown. His disappearance from the historical record after 316 BC, and the question of who ruled Bactria before its conquest by Seleucus Nicator, remain subjects of scholarly discussion. He is among the few non-Macedonian Greeks to have governed a major satrapy in this period, and belonged to one of the small group of "minor Diadochi" of the east.

== Origins ==
Stasanor is the only historical inhabitant of Soli mentioned by Strabo in his description of the cities of Cyprus. He is repeatedly styled "the Solian" in the lists of the satrapal distributions at Babylon and Triparadisus.

Since the nineteenth century, it has commonly been supposed that Stasanor belonged to the royal house of Soli. The conjecture, first advanced by W. H. Engel and popularized by Droysen, most often makes him a son of King Pasicrates, Alexander's ally at the siege of Tyre, and thus a brother of the trierarch Nicocles; others have preferred to see in him Pasicrates's brother. Waldemar Heckel, noting that several members of Cypriot ruling houses were enrolled among the hetairoi, allows the possibility while observing that it is far from certain, and that the silence of the sources on Stasanor's family, at a time when Nicocles is expressly identified as Pasicrates's son, is curious.

The hypothesis has been subjected to systematic criticism by E. O. Stoyanov, who observes that no ancient source records Stasanor's parentage; that Cypriot kings are never named in the narrative tradition without their royal title, so that Stasanor cannot himself have reigned; that the ethnicon "the Solian" is no marker of royal rank, since it appears only in the satrapy lists, whose common source (probably Hieronymus of Cardia, drawing on official documentation) seems to have distinguished Greeks such as Stasanor, Stasander, and Laomedon of Mytilene by their ethnics while leaving Macedonians unmarked; and that the name Stasanor belongs to a class of names that were characteristically Cypriot but attached to no particular social stratum. On this reckoning, Stasanor's place in the Cypriot nobility is guaranteed by his admission among the hetairoi, but his royal descent remains an unverifiable hypothesis.

== Career under Alexander ==
Stasanor probably entered Alexander's service after the Cypriot kings declared for him during the siege of Tyre in 332 BC, and accompanied the expedition thereafter as one of the hetairoi.

=== The mission to Aria ===
Stasanor first appears in the narrative sources in 329 BC. Before crossing the Oxus in pursuit of Bessus, Alexander sent him into Aria to arrest its satrap, the Persian Arsaces, and to rule the satrapy in his place. Arsaces, who had been appointed after the defection of Satibarzanes in 330, was suspected of deliberately shirking his duty to assist the Macedonian expeditionary force during the suppression of Satibarzanes's second revolt.

The chronology of the mission is complicated by a doublet in Arrian, who records the arrival of Stasanor and Phrataphernes, the satrap of Parthia, returning from a parallel commission, at Alexander's winter quarters twice: first at Zariaspa in the winter of 329/328, and again at Nautaca in the winter of 328/327. Bosworth has argued that the notice of 329/328, deriving from Ptolemy, is the erroneous member of the pair. The continuing disturbances in the central satrapies through 328, attested among other things by the contemporaneous deposition of Oxydates in Media, and the sheer distances involved make it incredible that Stasanor could have left Bactra in the summer of 329, pacified Aria, arrested Arsaces, and returned within the same campaigning year. Stasanor accordingly delivered Arsaces in chains to Alexander at Nautaca in the winter of 328/327, the version deriving from Aristobulus and corroborated by the parallel narrative of Curtius Rufus, arriving together with Phrataphernes, who brought as his own prisoner Nabarzanes, whom Bessus had appointed satrap of Parthia.

=== Satrap of Aria and Drangiana ===
At Nautaca, Alexander enlarged Stasanor's command with the addition of Drangiana. Curtius records that the satrap whom Stasanor replaced there was named Arsames. The notice was long dismissed as a confusion with Arsaces, but Arsames and Arsaces are distinct Persian names, and Arsames may have been installed over Drangiana in late 330 when Alexander divided the old joint satrapy of Drangiana and Arachosia, and retained until his replacement in the winter of 328/327. With the appointment, the whole Central Asian river system from the borders of Parthia to the Hindu Kush passed under two satraps of Greco-Macedonian origin.

Stasanor administered Aria and Drangiana throughout the Indian campaign. Late in 325, after the Gedrosian desert march, he was among those who met Alexander in Carmania, bringing a large and opportune supply of pack animals and camels; he may have been summoned in advance by Craterus, whose column had marched westward through Arachosia and Drangiana. Alexander sent him back to his satrapy, but in 324 he appears once more at Susa, among the satraps who brought contingents of Iranian troops for incorporation into the royal army.

=== The Liber de Morte ===
The propaganda pamphlet on the last days and testament of Alexander, preserved in the Metz Epitome and the Alexander Romance, places Stasanor at the banquet of Medius of Larissa at which the King was allegedly poisoned, and names him among the conspirators. The pamphlet is a tendentious production of the age of the successors, and the allegation is not treated as historical.

== Under the Successors ==
=== Babylon and Triparadisus ===
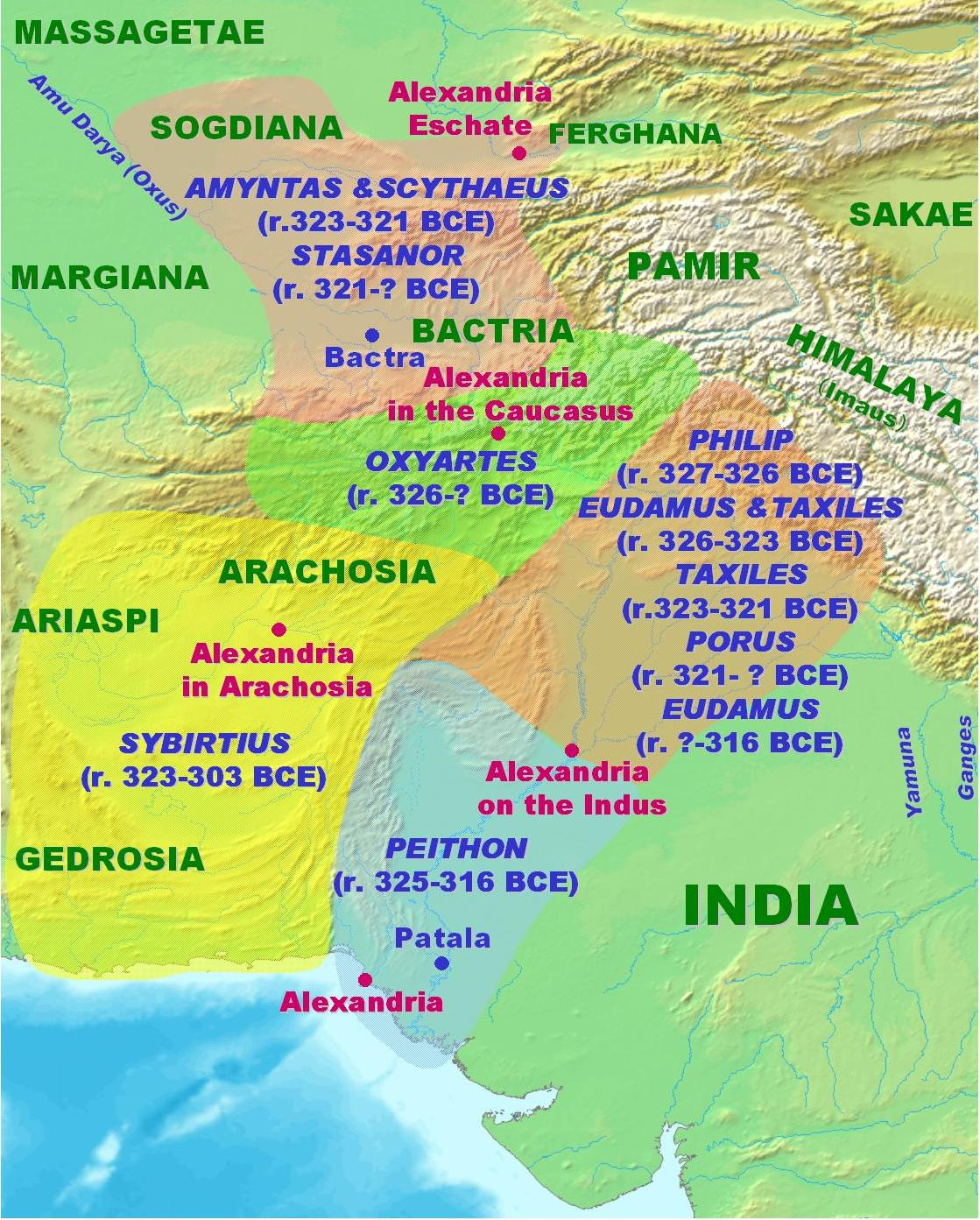
Stasanor was satrap of Bactria and Sogdiana from 321 BC.

In the settlement at Babylon (323 BC), Stasanor was confirmed in Aria and Drangiana. The parallel notice in Justin is textually corrupt: the transmitted text mangles "Soleus Stasanor" and, conflating the two partitions, appears to duplicate the man, entering him once under his own name and once in corrupted form with the satrapy he only later received.

At Triparadisus (320 BC; 321 BC in the older chronology) Stasanor was transferred to the satrapy of Bactria and Sogdiana, in place of the Macedonian Philip, who was moved to Parthia and Hyrcania; his fellow Cypriot Stasander, possibly a relative, succeeded him in Aria and Drangiana. An older hypercritical view that resolved Stasander into a mere doublet of Stasanor is now generally rejected.

The appointments followed the revolts of the Greek military settlers of the Upper Satrapies, who had risen in 325 BC on a false report of Alexander's death and again, in far greater numbers, upon his actual death in 323 BC, when more than twenty thousand rebels under Philon were crushed by Peithon. Rachel Mairs interprets the Triparadisus settlement, which entrusted the two great eastern commands to Cypriot Greeks while transferring the Macedonian Philip elsewhere, as a deliberate accommodation of a numerically strong Greek settler population of possibly anti-Macedonian sentiment, which needed to be calmed and settled.

=== The Second War of the Diadochi ===
The peace of the east was broken in 318 BC by Peithon, the satrap of Media, who seized Parthia, put to death its satrap Philip, and installed his own brother Eudemus in his place. Alarmed at his evident ambition to make himself master of the upper satrapies, the neighboring governors combined under Peucestas of Persis and drove Peithon back into Media, thereby constituting the coalition of eastern satraps whose forces were subsequently placed at the disposal of Eumenes of Cardia.

In the war between Eumenes of Cardia and Antigonus (318–316 BC), Stasanor did not take the field in person, but troops from his satrapy joined the coalition of the eastern satraps, marching west under the command of Stasander together with the forces of Aria and Drangiana. Heckel infers that Stasanor sent these contingents while himself remaining in Bactria. Grainger adds the strategic rationale that Bactria was too sensitive a post for its satrap to leave or to strip of many soldiers, a caution reflected in the size of the combined contingent of Aria, Drangiana, and Bactria under Stasander, which amounted to no more than 2,500 men. After the victory at Gabiene, Antigonus reorganized the eastern satrapies, executing or replacing several governors who had supported Eumenes. Stasanor's compatriot and possible relative Stasander lost his satrapy, though no execution is recorded; he was succeeded in Aria by Antigonus's appointee Evitus and, upon the latter's early death, by Evagoras, whose conspicuously Cypriot name has prompted the conjecture that Stasander had died and been replaced by a kinsman. Stasanor himself was left in place. Diodorus explains that his removal would have required a great army and a general of the first rank, both because of the remoteness of Bactria and because Stasanor had conducted his office with such favor toward the inhabitants as to make his position unassailable. Grainger doubts that strength was the operative consideration, observing that the Bactrian contingent with Eumenes had been modest; on his reading, the decisive factors were distance and the irrelevance, to Antigonus, of removing so remote a satrap.

=== The question of Parthia ===
A notice in Justin states that after Alexander's death, the command of the Parthians was entrusted to Stasanor, "a foreign ally," because no Macedonian wanted to accept it. As it stands, the statement cannot be correct, for Parthia went to Phrataphernes at Babylon and to Philip at Triparadisus. Edwyn Bevan proposed that it preserves, anachronistically reprojected upon the original division, a genuine arrangement of the years after 316 BC; the Parthian satrapy, vacant after Peithon's murder of Philip and the expulsion of Peithon's brother Eudamus by the confederate satraps, would have come under Stasanor's control. The interpretation was adopted by some historians of Parthia, but it remains a conjectural reading of a corrupt epitome, and others either regard the notice as a simple confusion or hold that Parthia, after the murder of its satrap, may have gone with Media rather than with Bactria.

=== Rule in Bactria ===
A rare glimpse of Stasanor's administration is preserved by the Neoplatonist Porphyry, who reports that Stasanor, "one of Alexander's prefects", nearly lost his command in the attempt to abolish the Bactrian custom of casting out the old and the sick to be devoured by dogs. The same custom is described by Strabo on the authority of Onesicritus, who credited its suppression to Alexander.

== Disappearance and the fate of Bactria ==
Stasanor is last securely attested in Diodorus's account of the settlement of 316 BC; nothing further is directly recorded of him. Presumably, the satraps confirmed by Antigonus remained in office to face Seleucus. Bactria and Sogdiana conspicuously furnished no troops to the army with which Nicanor, Antigonus's general of Media and the upper satrapies, opposed Seleucus in 312/311 BC. Thus, according to Grainger, Stasanor was by then, in his description, semi-independent, and Seleucus's first establishment in the east left him undisturbed.

Justin further records that Seleucus, after securing Babylon, "subdued the Bactrians" in the course of his eastern campaigns (c. 308–305 BC), without naming his adversary; whether Stasanor still lived and ruled at the time of the Seleucid conquest, or had already been succeeded by another, cannot be determined. Justin's "Bactrians" may denote the native population rather than the forces of the Greek satrap. Coinages found in Bactrian and Arachosian contexts, assigned on numismatic grounds to the interval between the death of Alexander IV of Macedon and the arrival of Seleucus, bear on the question. The issues of Sophytes, probably a ruler in Bactria or a neighboring region, perhaps in rebellion against Stasanor, may indicate that Stasanor's grip on his vast satrapy may have loosened with time. Archil Balakhvantsev has more recently argued on numismatic grounds that the coinage of a certain Andragoras belongs to Bactria in precisely this interval rather than to the third-century Seleucid satrap of Parthia of the same name, and has identified its issuer as a Cypriot, the youngest son of King Androcles of Amathus, who followed his countryman east and contended for power after Stasanor's death; he has further proposed, more speculatively, that two diademed male heads of unbaked clay excavated in the Oxus Temple at Takht-i Sangin portray Stasanor and Andragoras, observing that in the classical Greek world sculpture in unbaked clay was a distinctively Cypriot technique. These identifications have not won general acceptance; the prevailing attribution of the Andragoras coinage remains to the Parthian satrap.

The concentration of Cypriots in the Upper Satrapies, Stasanor in Bactria and Sogdiana, and Stasander in Aria and Drangiana, has attracted explanation from two directions. Cypriot Greeks may have been judged particularly capable of carrying out Alexander's policy of rapprochement between conquerors and conquered. Mairs, approaching from the side of the colonists, sees in the same appointments a response to the restiveness of the Greek settlers, for whose management Greek rather than Macedonian governors were the fitter instruments.

== Assessment ==
Mairs characterizes him as a recurrent "trouble-shooter" among the satraps of the east, repeatedly deployed against provinces in disorder. T. S. Brown attributed Stasanor's advancement to high birth, on the ground that a Greek in Macedonian service could not otherwise have risen so far; Stoyanov counters that Stasanor's documented ability as soldier and administrator, attested both by his Central Asian commands and by the strength of his later position in Bactria, is itself a sufficient explanation. Grainger accords Stasanor a founder's share in the making of Hellenistic Bactria: the network of Alexander's city foundations was the basis of Stasanor's rule as afterwards of Seleucus's, and the foundations of the Hellenistic province were, in his judgment, laid partly by Stasanor and partly by Seleucus and Antiochus.

== See also ==
- Stasander – fourth-century BC general under Alexander the Great
- Andragoras – third-century BC satrap of Parthia under the Seleucids
- Andragoras – fourth-century BC satrap of Parthia under Alexander the Great

== Sources ==
=== Ancient ===
- Arrian, Anabasis Alexandri; Events after Alexander (Successors), FGrH 156
- Quintus Curtius Rufus, Historiae Alexandri Magni
- Dexippus, FGrH 100
- Diodorus Siculus, Bibliotheca historica, books 17–19
- Justin, Epitome of the Philippic History of Pompeius Trogus
- Liber de Morte
- Orosius, Historiae adversus paganos
- Porphyry, De abstinentia
- Strabo, Geographica

=== Modern ===
- Balakhvantsev, Archil (2020). "Stasanor and Andragoras: Two Cypriot Princes at the Hellenistic Far East". In Held, Winfried (ed.). The Transition from the Achaemenid to the Hellenistic Period in the Levant, Cyprus, and Cilicia: Cultural Interruption or Continuity?. Marburger Beiträge zur Archäologie. Vol. 6. Marburg: Archäologisches Seminar der Philipps-Universität. pp. 107–112.
- Bevan, Edwyn Robert (1902). The House of Seleucus. Vol. 1. London: Edward Arnold.
- Bosworth, A. B. (1981). "A Missing Year in the History of Alexander the Great". The Journal of Hellenic Studies. 101: 17–39. doi:10.2307/629841. JSTOR 629841.
- Brown, Truesdell S. (1947). "Hieronymus of Cardia". The American Historical Review. 52 (4): 684–696. doi:10.2307/1873156. JSTOR 1873156.
- Debevoise, Neilson C. (1938). A Political History of Parthia. Chicago: University of Chicago Press.
- Grainger, John D. (1990). Seleukos Nikator: Constructing a Hellenistic Kingdom. London: Routledge. ISBN 978-0-415-04701-2.
- Heckel, Waldemar (2006). Who's Who in the Age of Alexander the Great: Prosopography of Alexander's Empire. Oxford: Blackwell. ISBN 978-1-4051-1210-9.
- Heckel, Waldemar (2020). In the Path of Conquest: Resistance to Alexander the Great. New York: Oxford University Press. ISBN 978-0-19-0076702.
- Mairs, Rachel (2006). Ethnic Identity in the Hellenistic Far East (PhD thesis). University of Cambridge.
- Stoyanov, E. O. (2016). "K voprosu o proiskhozhdenii Stasanora Soliyskogo" [On the Issue of the Stasanor the Solian's Descent]. Problemy istorii, filologii, kul'tury (in Russian) (2 (52)): 100–110. doi:10.18503/1992-0431-2016-2-52-100-110.
