= Stasander =

Stasander (Ancient Greek: Στάσανδρος; lived 4th century BC) was a Soloian general in the service of Alexander the Great. Upon Alexander's death he became the satrap of Aria, Arachosia and Drangiana. He lost control of his satrapies after being defeated by the Antigonids in the Wars of the Diadochi.

== Biography ==
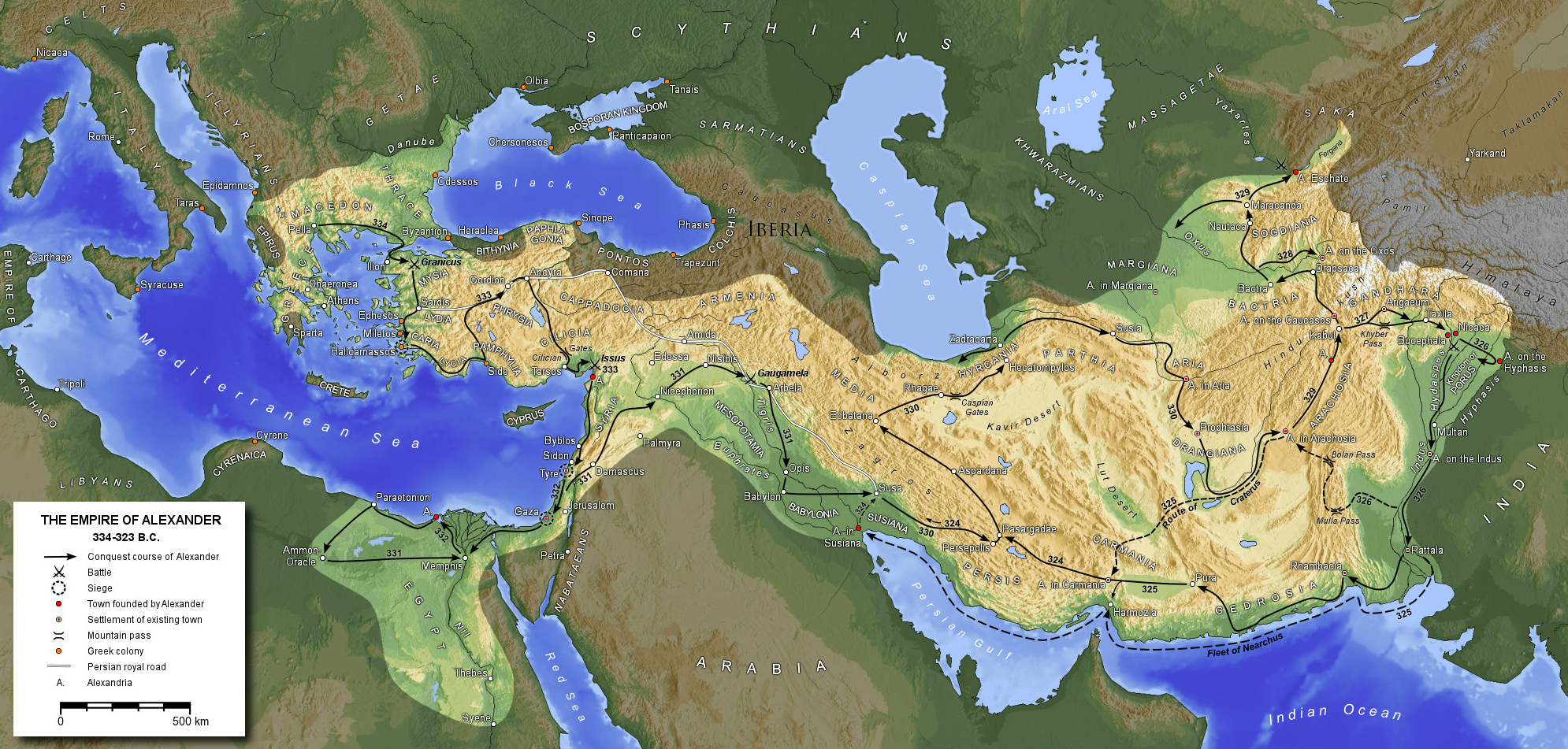
Map of Alexander's empire and his route.

Stasander was born in the Kingdom of Soli, in the 4th century BC At the time of his birth the ten city-kingdoms of Cyprus were vassals of the Achaemenid Empire (Persia) which had conquered them either in 546 or 526 BC. In May 334 BC, the Achaemenids came into conflict with Kingdom of Macedon ruled by Alexander the Great. The Cypriots and Phoenicians formed the core of the Persian navy in the Mediterranean consisting of 400 ships. Upon receiving news of the devastating Persian defeat at the Battle of Issus, the Cypriot kingdoms defected to the Macedonians assembling at Sidon in the middle of May 332 BC. Alexander pardoned the Cypriots on account that their allegiance to the Persians was a matter of duress. Cypriots took part in Alexander's numerous conquests starting from the Siege of Tyre. Stasander and his brother Stasanor were among those who entered the service of Macedon, eventually becoming two of Alexander's companions, an inner circle of his most trusted generals. Their rapid promotion may have been due to the fact that they belonged to the royal house of Soli.

Alexander ordered Stasanor to arrest Arsaces the satrap of Aria. Stasanor consequently assumed power in the satrapy himself. In 323 BC, Alexander died and his empire was partitioned among his generals. As a result of the 321 BC Partition of Triparadisus Stasanor was granted the satrapies of Bactria and Sogdiana, whilst Stasander took over Aria and Drangiana. During the course of the Wars of the Diadochi he sided with Eumenes against Antigonus I Monophthalmus. He was defeated by the Antigonids at the Battle of Gabiene. Antigonus ultimately defeated Eumenes and his allies giving Stasander's satrapies to Euitus. The date of Stasander's death is unknown.

== See also ==
- Stasanor, another Cypriot general of Alexander the Great from Soli
