= Rachel Mairs =

Classical scholar and linguist

- Occupations: Classicist, ancient historian

Academic background
- Education: University of Cambridge

Academic work
- Discipline: Classics
- Sub-discipline: Multilingualism and literacy
- Institutions: University of Reading

Rachel Mairs is a classical scholar, ancient historian and linguist. She is a professor of Classics and Middle Eastern Studies at University of Reading. Her research focuses ancient multilingualism, with a focus on the interaction between Greeks and "non-Greeks" in Hellenistic Egypt and on Central Asia.

== Academic career ==
Rachel Mairs received her MPhil and PhD from the Faculty of Classics, University of Cambridge. Her 2006 PhD thesis, Ethnic Identity in the Hellenistic Far East, focused on Greeks in Bactria-Sogdiana, Arachosia and India, and became part of her monograph published by University of California Press in 2014. Her other books on the ancient world include The Archaeology of the Hellenistic Far East: A Survey (2011) and The Graeco-Bactrian and Indo-Greek World (2020). She has also published an open-access book, Arabic Dialogues: Phrasebooks and the Learning of Colloquial Arabic, 1798-1945 (2024) with University College London Press. She co-runs the academic blog Everyday Orientalism, which works to highlight the legacies of colonialism in papyrology and classics.

== Awards and recognition ==
Rachel Mairs was awarded a Mid-Career Fellowship by the British Academy in 2018. She has also received funding from UKRI for her project IndigenousGuides under the Horizon Europe guarantee scheme.

== Bibliography ==
- Doff, S., Iamartino, G., Mairs, R., eds. (2025) Women in the history of language learning and teaching: hidden pioneers of practice from Europe and beyond (1400-2000). Routledge, London. ISBN 9789048558339
- Bowman, A., Crowther, C., Hornblower, S., Mairs, R., Savvolpoulos, K., eds. (2025) Corpus of Ptolemaic inscriptions part I: Greek, bilingual, and trilingual inscriptions from Egypt volume 2 the Fayum and the Valley (Nos. 207-409). Oxford Studies in Ancient Documents, Oxford University Press, pp. 576. ISBN 9780198860495
