= Soli, Cyprus =

Ancient city-kingdom of Cyprus

Soli
- Σόλοι
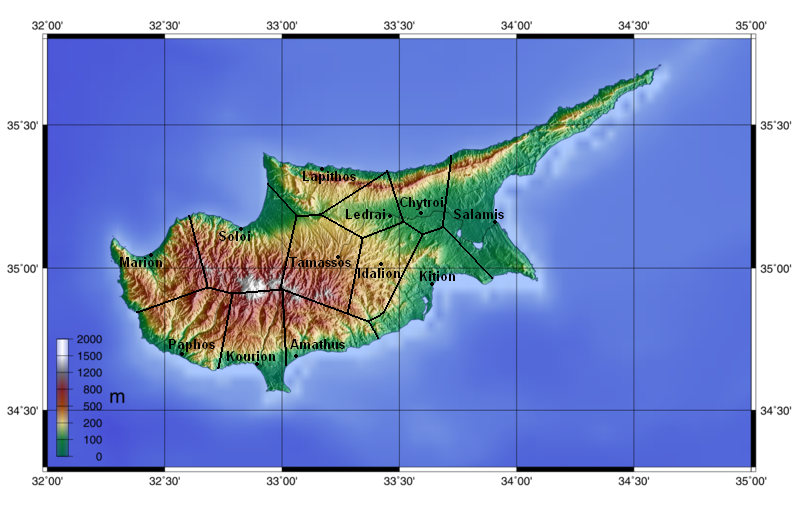
- Map showing the 10 ancient city Kingdoms of Cyprus

- Location within Cyprus
- 35.140°N 32.811°E
- Location: Cyprus
- Region: Nicosia District

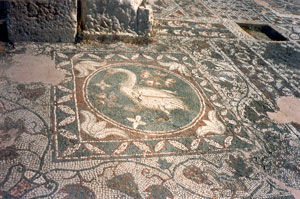
The swan mosaic at Soli

Soli or Soloi (Greek: Σόλοι) was an ancient city-kingdom in the southwest of the island of Cyprus. It supplied Athens with timber and copper in exchange for luxury metalware. An ancient tradition attributes the layout and naming of Soli to the Athenian statesman Solon (630–560 BC), who reportedly planned the urban center during a decade-long journey. Archaeological evidence challenges this etymological link, as royal inscriptions on the 7th BC Neo-Assyrian Prism of Esarhaddon, which predates Solon's time, record Soli as one of the "ten city-kingdoms of Cyprus".

Soli is near the modern town of Karavostasi, southwest of Morphou (Guzelyurt) on the coast of the Gulf of Morphou. The site was captured by Turkey during the 1974 invasion and is currently controlled by Northern Cyprus.

== Archaeological excavations ==
The Swedish Cyprus Expedition, led by Einar Gjerstad, excavated Soli during October 1927. The ancient town of Soli was located on the Mesaoria plain which was a well-situated place, close to the sea and harbor in the north as well as cultivated plains to the east and Cyprus's richest copper district to the south. The very top plateau was surrounded by a strong wall of similar construction to the city wall. The entrance was probably to the north side. Within this area, the foundation of a temple (temple in antis) was found. The Acropolis Hill was probably the first to be inhabited. When the town grew larger the area between the hill and the sea was inhabited. The buildings were often repaired and rebuilt. The town of Soli has changed from time to time. The earliest potsherds are from the Cypro-Archaic periods but there are very few of them in comparison to the Cypro-Hellenistic and Cypro-Roman sherds.

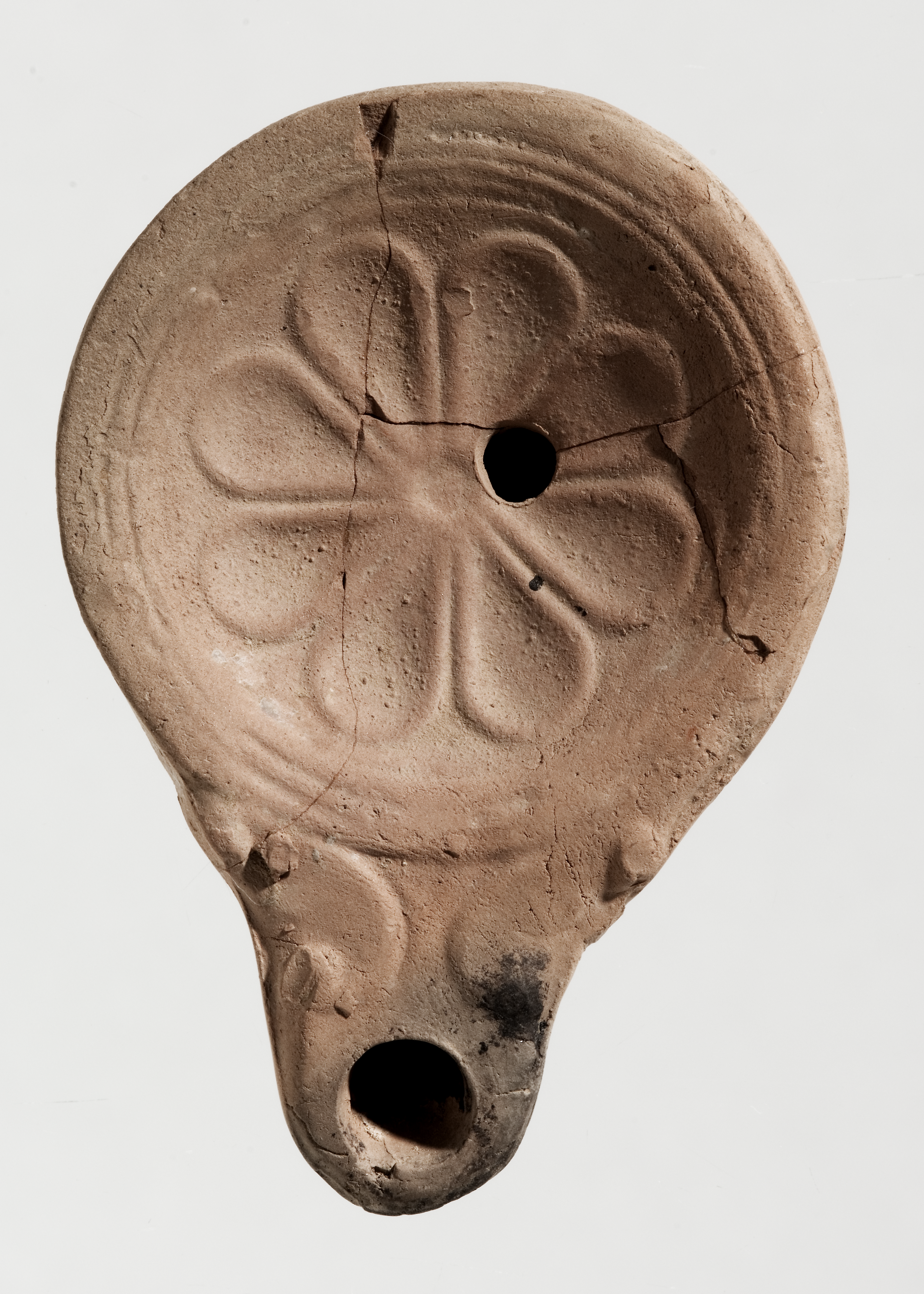
Molded Roman lamp from Soli, c. 50 B.C. – c. 150 A.D.

The necropolis of Soli is spread over an enormous area around the town. Thousands of the tombs had already been opened by modern tomb robbers and were therefore destroyed. The sherds from the robbed tombs make it possible to date them and most of them are from the Cypro-Archaic II period to the Cypro-Roman.

=== Temples at Cholades ===
According to the excavators many of the walls at Cholades were made of reused material found in the river below the sites. Sometimes even pieces of broken statues were reused in the walls. Several walls had been decorated with murals, most of them were found on fragments of stucco, fallen to the floors close to the walls. In one room the paintings were better preserved, and the pattern could be studied. The other rooms seem to have had walls decorated with vertical and horizontal lines in red, blue, black, and green creating large squares. One room had fragments with wide red bands as well.

Marble sculpture found at Soli, likely representing Aphrodite. Cypro-Hellenistic, IB. Cyprus Museum, Nicosia.

They also found water conduits, cisterns, stairs and altars. The buildings create a temple complex consisting of different temples numbered from A to F. The temples were altered, changed, and rebuilt during four periods. Material from the temples displays a particularly rich material of sculptures made of marble and limestone. Temples A and B were conjointly dedicated to Aphrodite and Cybele. One or possibly both of temples C and D were sacred to Isis and temple E to Serapis Canopus and Eros. Temple F was dedicated to Mithras. During the first period, there was a loose connection between the cella and the irregular courtyards in front of it. In period 2 (temple B, C, and D) the shape is still irregular although the connection between the cella and courtyards is beginning to get closer. In the third period, temple E was reconstructed with the cellae and courtyards built together as a closed unit and it seems like the importance of symmetry improves. In period 4 are some courtyards roofed with several closed chapels. The temples date from the Cypro-Hellenistic period and the Roman times.

From the Swedish Cyprus Expedition's excavation at Soli Cholades. Construction of temples C-F.

The marble sculptures found during the excavation were probably made from imported marble. It seems likely that the heads were made separately from the body and fitted together with an iron pin. Some sculptures have been mended. All the sculptures were once painted and the colours are faintly preserved. Other sculptures were made of alabaster, terracotta as well as soft and hard limestone. Some of the sculptures were found on site and these were always located in connection to the cellae. They probably were placed on the altars in the cellae. Therefore the altars might have been used as iconostasis, or a stand for the various sculptures. This was only observed with the sculptures in the cella, not the ones from the courtyards or outside. The sculptures from period 1 (250 B.C.) were all found in temple A. From period 2 (end of 2nd century B.C.) all the sculptures were found at temples B, C, and D. From period 3 (middle of the 3rd century A.D.) and 4 (beginning of the 4th century. A.D.) all the sculptures were found in temple E.

=== Theatre ===
Representation of the theatre at Soli during the Roman period, by John Lindros.

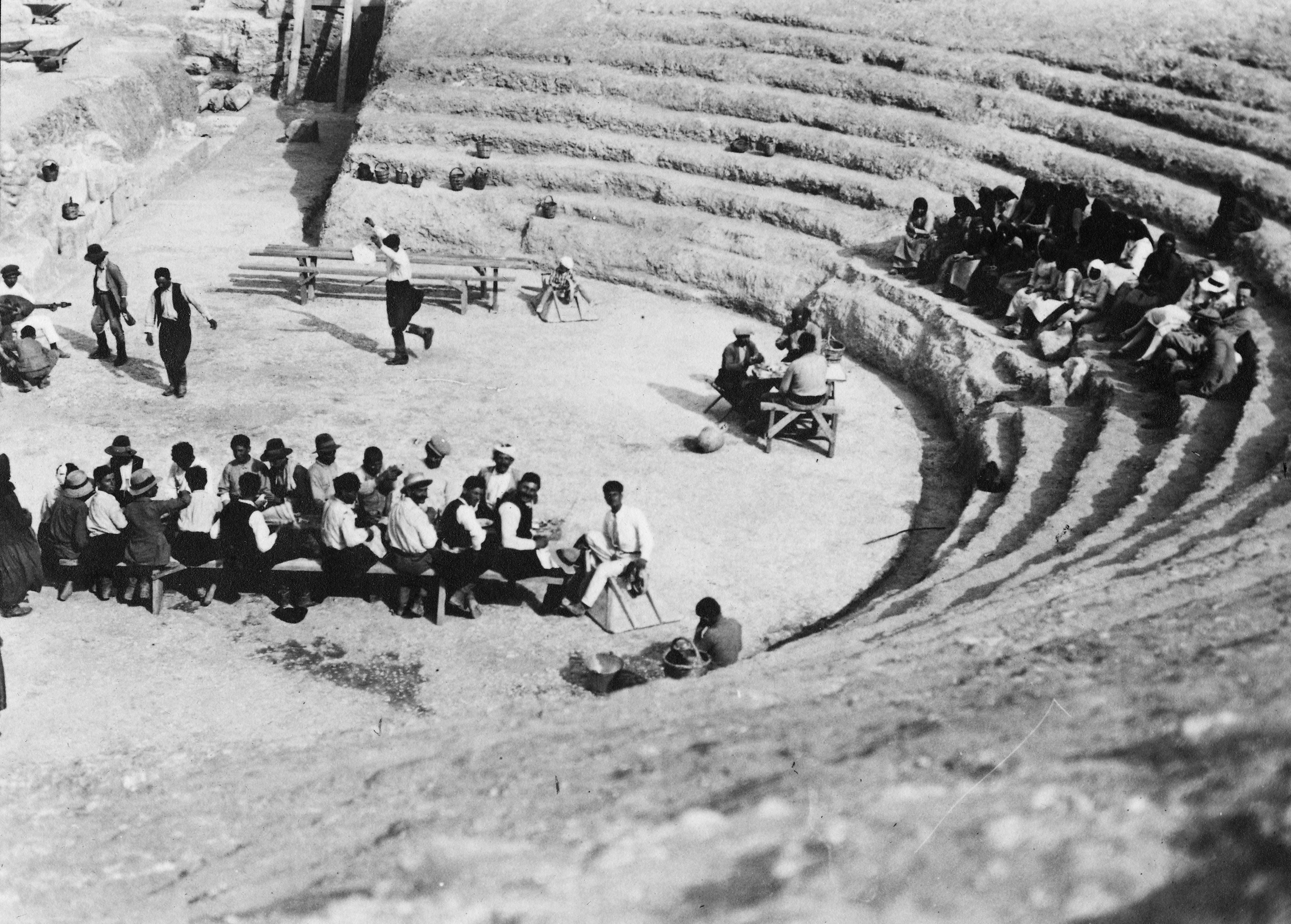
Party in the theater's orchestra. Soli, 1927–1931.

Further on the Swedish Cyprus Expedition excavated an ancient theatre at Soli. They proposed that the theatre was planned and erected in one piece and they could not distinguish any building periods. The structure displays that the theatre is from the Roman period and coins exhibit an even more precise date, 42/43 A.D. as well as 66–70 A.D. It seems to have been in use until the fourth century. The theatre consists of three parts, orchestra, auditorium, and stage-building. The orchestra is cut out of the rock and has a semicircular shape with a rectangular addition in front. The floor of the orchestra was plastered with lime cement and the rainwater was carried off by a conduit of terracotta pipes. Two entrances, the western and eastern paradoi, lead to the orchestra. The auditorium was also semicircular and cut into the rock of the sloping hill. The auditorium is divided by a diazoma covered by limestone slabs.

== Notable people ==
- Stasanor, 4th century BC general of Alexander the Great and later governor of Drangiana, Bactria and Sogdiana, following the partition of Triparadisus (Arrian, Successors 35).
- Stasander, 4th century BC general of Alexander the Great and later Satrap of Aria and Drangiana
- Clearchus of Soli, 4th century BC peripatetician philosopher, thought to have been to Alexandria on the Oxus, in Bactria.

== See also ==
- List of ancient Greek cities
- Solon
