= Diadochi =

Political rivals in the aftermath of Alexander the Great's death

The Diadochi fought over and carved up Alexander's empire into several kingdoms after his death, a legacy which continued the influence of ancient Greek culture abroad for over 300 more years. This map depicts the kingdoms of the Diadochi c. 301 BC, after the Battle of Ipsus. The five kingdoms of the Diadochi were: Kingdom of Ptolemy I Soter Kingdom of Cassander Kingdom of Lysimachus Empire of Seleucus I Nicator Kingdom of Epirus Other Carthaginian Empire Roman Republic Greek colonies

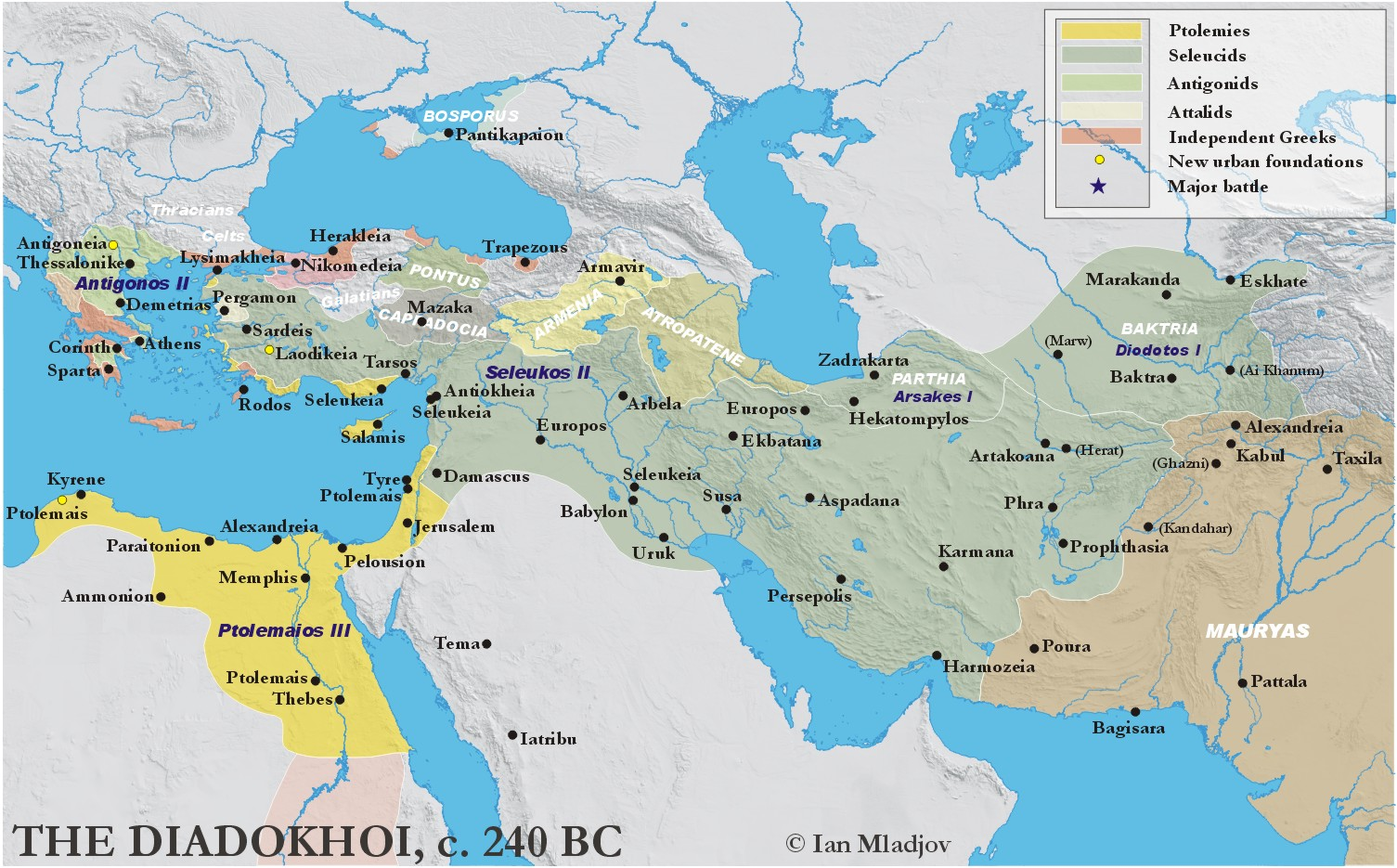
Hellenistic kingdoms as they existed in 240 BC, eight decades after the death of Alexander the Great

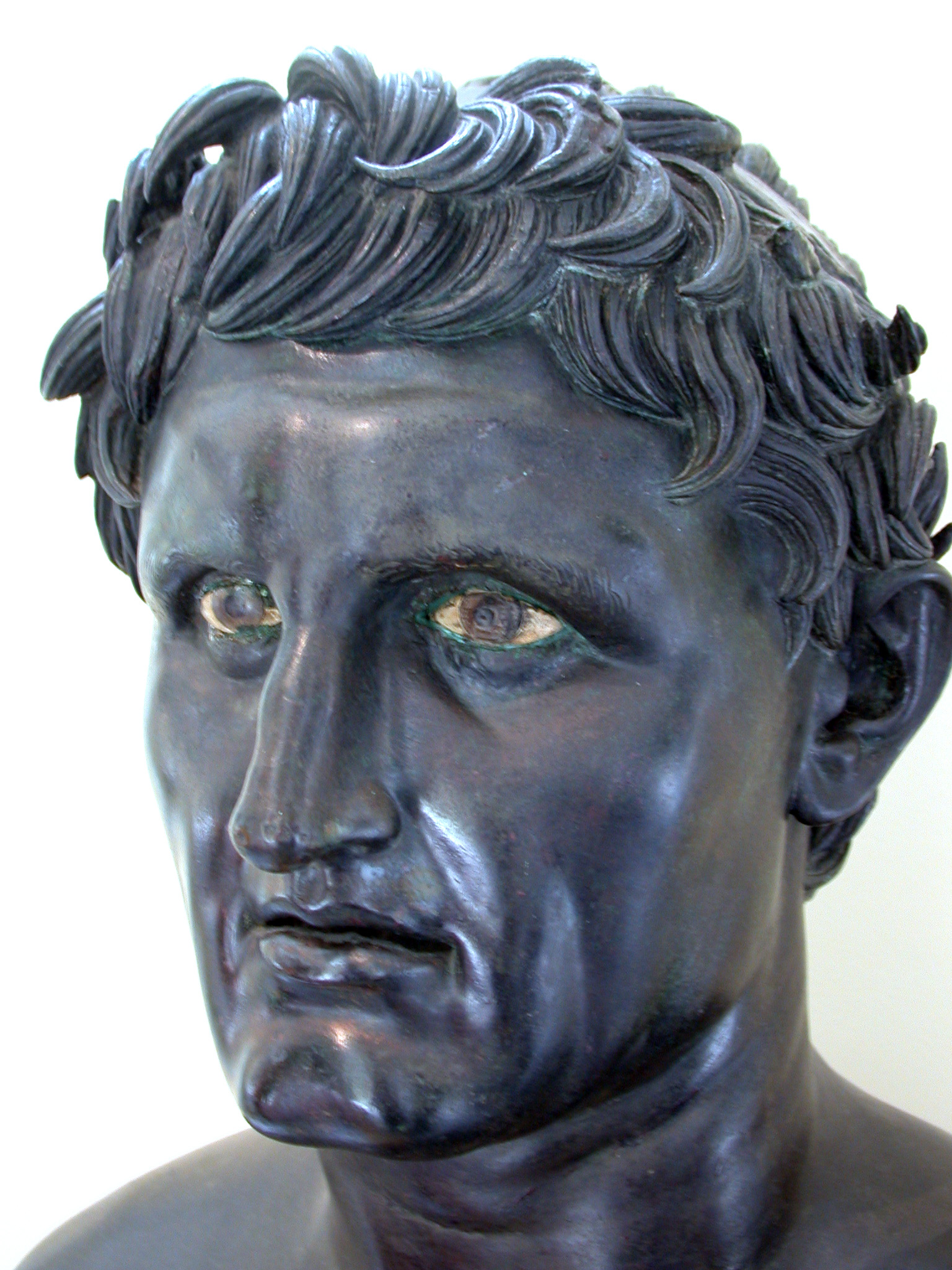
Bust of Seleucus I Nicator ("Victor"; c. 358 – 281 BC), the last of the original Diadochi.

The Diadochi (Note: /daɪˈædəkaɪ/ dy-AD-ə-ky; Ancient Greek: Διάδοχοι, romanized: Diádochoi, lit. 'Successors', Koine Greek pronunciation: [diˈadokʰy]; sing.: diadochos or diadochus) were the rival generals, families, and friends of Alexander the Great who fought for control over his empire after his death in 323 BC. The Wars of the Diadochi mark the beginning of the Hellenistic period from the Mediterranean Sea to the Indus River Valley.

The most notable Diadochi include Perdicas, Eumenes, Lysimachus, Cassander, Ptolemy, Seleucus, Antigonus and his son Demetrius Poliorcetes, with the last ones founding Ptolemaic, Seleucid and Antigonid dynasties respectively, that lasted for several centuries after the end of the Wars of the Successors, ruling in Egypt, Levant, Asia-Minor, Mesopotamia, Persia and Macedon.

== Background ==
=== Ancient role ===
In ancient Greek, diadochos is a noun (substantive or adjective) formed from the verb, diadechesthai, "succeed to," a compound of dia- and dechesthai, "receive." The word-set descends straightforwardly from Indo-European *dek-, "receive", the substantive forms being from the o-grade, *dok-. Some important English reflexes are dogma, "a received teaching," decent, "fit to be received," and paradox, "against that which is received." The prefix dia- changes the meaning slightly to add a social expectation to the received. The diadochos, being a successor in command or any other office, expects to receive that office.

==== Basileus ====
It was exactly this expectation that contributed to strife in the Alexandrine and Hellenistic Ages, beginning with Alexander. Philip II had married a woman who changed her name to Olympias to honor the coincidence of Philip's victory in the Olympic Games and Alexander's birth, an act that suggests love may have been a motive as well. Macedon's chief office was the basileia, or monarchy, the chief officer being the basileus, now the signatory title of Philip. Their son and heir, Alexander, was raised with care, being educated by select prominent philosophers. Philip is said to have wept for joy when Alexander performed a feat of which no one else was capable, taming the wild horse, Bucephalus, at his first attempt in front of a skeptical audience including the king. Amidst the cheering onlookers Philip swore that Macedonia was not large enough for Alexander.

Philip built Macedonia into the leading military state of the Balkans. He had acquired his expertise fighting for Thebes and Greek freedom under his patron, Epaminondas. When Alexander was a teenager, Philip was planning a military solution to the contention with the Persian Empire. In the opening campaign against Byzantium he made Alexander "regent" (kurios) in his absence. Alexander used every opportunity to further his father's victories, expecting that he would be a part of them. At the report of each of Philip's victories, Alexander was said to lament that his father would leave him nothing of note to do.

There was a source of disaffection, however. Plutarch reports that Alexander and his mother bitterly reproached him for his numerous affairs among the women of his court. Philip then fell in love and married a young woman, Cleopatra, when he was too old for marriage. (Macedonian kings traditionally had multiple wives.) Alexander was at the wedding banquet when Attalus, Cleopatra's uncle, made a remark that seemed inappropriate to him. He asked the Macedonians to pray for an "heir to the kingship" (diadochon tes basileias). Rising to his feet Alexander shouted, using the royal "we," "Do we seem like bastards (nothoi) to you, evil-minded man?" and threw a cup at him. The inebriated Philip, rising to his feet and drawing his sword to defend Attalus, promptly fell. Making a comment that the man who was preparing to cross from Europe to Asia could not cross from one couch to another, Alexander departed, to escort his mother to her native Epirus and to wait himself in Illyria. Not long after, prompted by Demaratus the Corinthian to mend the dissension in his house, Philip sent Demaratus to bring Alexander home. The expectation by virtue of which Alexander was diadochos was that as the son of Philip, he would inherit Philip's throne.

In 336 BC Philip was assassinated, and the 20-year-old Alexander "received the kingship" (parelabe ten basileian). In the same year Darius succeeded to the throne of Persia as Šâhe Šâhân, "King of Kings," which the Greeks understood as "Great King." The role of the Macedonian basileus was changing fast. Alexander's army was already multinational. Alexander was acquiring dominion over state after state. His presence on the battlefield seemed to ensure immediate victory.

==== Hegemon ====
When Alexander the Great died on June 10, 323 BC, he left behind a huge empire which comprised many essentially independent territories. Alexander's empire stretched from his homeland of Macedon itself, along with the Greek city-states that his father had subdued, to Bactria and parts of India in the east. It included parts of the present day Balkans, Anatolia, the Levant, Egypt, Babylonia, and most of the former Achaemenid Empire, except for some lands the Achaemenids formerly held in Central Asia.

== Successors ==
The hetairoi (Ancient Greek: ἑταῖροι), or companion cavalry, added flexibility to the ancient Macedonian army. The hetairoi were a special cavalry unit composed of general officers without fixed rank, whom Alexander could assign where needed. They were typically from the nobility; many were related to Alexander. A parallel flexible structure in the Achaemenid army facilitated combined units.

Staff meetings to adjust command structure were nearly a daily event in Alexander's army. They created an ongoing expectation among the hetairoi of receiving an important and powerful command, if only for a short term. At the moment of Alexander's death, all possibilities were suddenly suspended. The hetairoi vanished with Alexander, to be replaced instantaneously by the Diadochi, men who knew where they had stood, but not where they would stand now. As there had been no definite ranks or positions of hetairoi, there were no ranks of Diadochi. They expected appointments, but without Alexander they would have to make their own.

For purposes of this presentation, the Diadochi are grouped by their rank and social standing at the time of Alexander's death. These were their initial positions as Diadochi.

=== Craterus ===
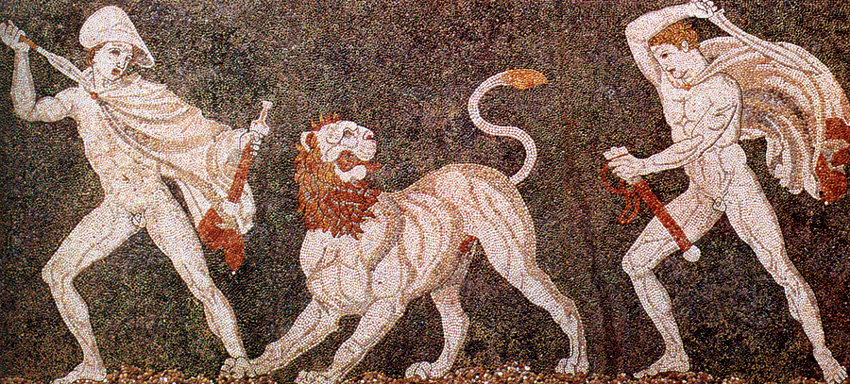
Alexander the Great and Craterus in a lion hunt, mosaic from Pella, Greece, late 4th century BC

Craterus was an infantry and naval commander under Alexander during his conquest of the Achaemenid Empire. After the revolt of his army at Opis on the Tigris in 324, Alexander ordered Craterus to command the veterans as they returned home to Macedonia. Antipater, commander of Alexander's forces in Greece and regent of the Macedonian throne in Alexander's absence, would lead a force of fresh troops back to Persia to join Alexander while Craterus would become regent in his place. When Craterus arrived at Cilicia in 323 BC, news reached him of Alexander's death. Though his distance from Babylon prevented him from participating in the distribution of power, Craterus hastened to Macedonia to assume the protection of Alexander's family. The news of Alexander's death caused the Greeks to rebel in the Lamian War. Craterus and Antipater defeated the rebellion in 322 BC. Despite his absence, the generals gathered at Babylon confirmed Craterus as Guardian of the Royal Family. However, with the royal family in Babylon, the Regent Perdiccas assumed this responsibility until the royal household could return to Macedonia.

=== Antipater ===
Antipater was an adviser to King Philip II, Alexander's father, a role he continued under Alexander. When Alexander left Macedon to conquer Persia in 334 BC, Antipater was named Regent of Macedon and General of Greece in Alexander's absence. In 323 BC, Craterus was ordered by Alexander to march his veterans back to Macedon and assume Antipater's position while Antipater was to march to Persia with fresh troops. Alexander's death that year, however, prevented the order from being carried out. When Alexander's generals gathered at the Partition of Babylon to divide the empire between themselves, Antipater was confirmed as General of Greece while the roles of Regent of the Empire and Guardian of the Royal Family were given to Perdiccas and Craterus, respectively. Together, the three men formed the top ruling group of the empire.

=== Somatophylakes ===
The Somatophylakes were the seven bodyguards of Alexander.

=== Macedonian satraps ===
Satraps (Old Persian: xšaçapāvā) were the governors of the provinces in the Hellenistic empires.

=== The Epigoni ===
Originally the Epigoni (/ɪˈpɪɡənaɪ/; from Ancient Greek: Ἐπίγονοι "offspring") were the sons of the Argive heroes who had fought in the first Theban war. In the 19th century the term was used to refer to the second generation of Diadochi rulers.

== Chronology ==
=== Struggle for unity (323–319 BC) ===
==== Partition of Babylon ====
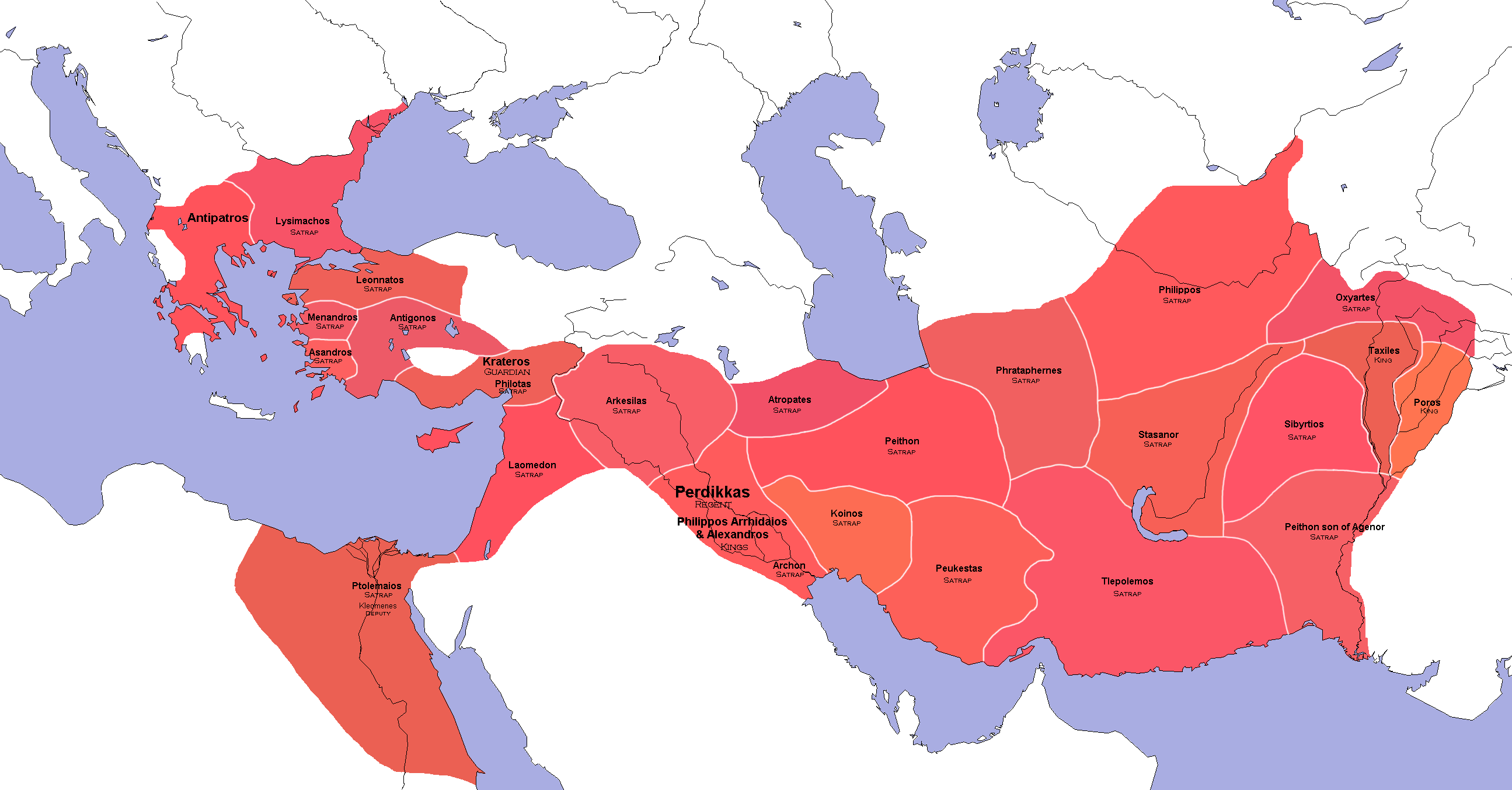
The distribution of satrapies in the Macedonian Empire after the Settlement in Babylon (323 BC).

Without a clear successor, Alexander's generals quickly began to dispute the rule of his empire. The two contenders were Alexander's half-brother Arrhidaeus and his unborn child with Roxana. Meleager and the infantry supported Arrhidaeus while Perdiccas and the cavalry supported waiting until the birth of Roxana's child.

A compromise was arranged, with Arrhidaeus being crowned as Philip III. If Roxana's child was a son, they would rule jointly. Perdiccas was named Regent and Meleager as his lieutenant. Eventually, Roxana did give birth to Alexander's son, Alexander IV. However, Perdiccas had Meleager and the other infantry leaders murdered and assumed full control.

Perdiccas, summoned a council of the great men of Alexander's court to appoint satraps for the parts of the Empire in the partition of Babylon. Ptolemy received Egypt; Laomedon received Syria and Phoenicia; Philotas took Cilicia; Peithon took Media; Antigonus received Phrygia, Lycia and Pamphylia; Asander received Caria; Menander received Lydia; Lysimachus received Thrace; Leonnatus received Hellespontine Phrygia; and Neoptolemus had Armenia. Macedon and the rest of Greece were to be jointly ruled by Antipater and Craterus, while Alexander's former secretary, Eumenes of Cardia, was to receive Cappadocia and Paphlagonia.

Alexander's arrangements in the east were left intact. Taxiles and Porus governed over their kingdoms in India; Alexander's father-in-law Oxyartes governed Gandara; Sibyrtius governed Arachosia and Gedrosia; Stasanor governed Aria and Drangiana; Philip governed Bactria and Sogdia; Phrataphernes governed Parthia and Hyrcania; Peucestas governed Persis; Tlepolemus had charge over Carmania; Atropates governed northern Media; Archon got Babylonia; and Arcesilaus governed northern Mesopotamia.

==== Revolt in Greece ====
Meanwhile, the news of Alexander's death had inspired a revolt in Greece, known as the Lamian War. Athens and other cities joined, ultimately besieging Antipater in the fortress of Lamia. Antipater was relieved by a force sent by Leonnatus, who was killed in action, but the war did not come to an end until Craterus's arrival with a fleet to defeat the Athenians at the Battle of Crannon on September 5, 322 BC. For a time, this brought an end to any resistance to Macedonian domination. Meanwhile, Peithon suppressed a revolt of Greek settlers in the eastern parts of the Empire, and Perdiccas and Eumenes subdued Cappadocia.

==== First War of the Diadochi (322–320 BC) ====
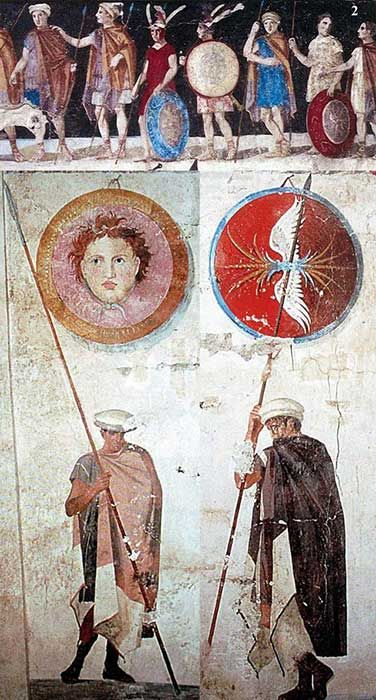
Paintings of ancient Macedonian soldiers, arms, and armaments, from the tomb of Agios Athanasios, Thessaloniki in Greece, 4th century BC

Soon, however, conflict broke out. Perdiccas' marriage to Alexander's sister Cleopatra led Antipater, Craterus, Antigonus, and Ptolemy to join in rebellion. The actual outbreak of war was initiated by Ptolemy's theft of Alexander's body and its transfer to Egypt. Although Eumenes defeated the rebels in Asia Minor, in a battle at which Craterus was killed, it was all for nought, as Perdiccas himself was murdered by his own generals Peithon, Seleucus, and Antigenes during an invasion of Egypt.

Ptolemy came to terms with Perdiccas's murderers, making Peithon and Arrhidaeus regents in his place, but soon these came to a new agreement with Antipater at the Partition of Triparadisus. Antipater was made regent of the Empire, and the two kings were moved to Macedon. Antigonus remained in charge of Phrygia, Lycia, and Pamphylia, to which was added Lycaonia. Ptolemy retained Egypt, Lysimachus retained Thrace, while the three murderers of Perdiccas—Seleucus, Peithon, and Antigenes—were given the provinces of Babylonia, Media, and Susiana respectively. Arrhidaeus, the former Regent, received Hellespontine Phrygia. Antigonus was charged with the task of rooting out Perdiccas's former supporter, Eumenes. In effect, Antipater retained for himself control of Europe, while Antigonus, as leader of the largest army east of the Hellespont, held a similar position in Asia.

==== Death of Antipater ====
Soon after the second partition, in 319 BC, Antipater died. Antipater had been one of the few remaining individuals with enough prestige to hold the empire together. After his death, war soon broke out again and the fragmentation of the empire began in earnest. Passing over his own son, Cassander, Antipater had declared Polyperchon his successor as Regent. A civil war soon broke out in Macedon and Greece between Polyperchon and Cassander, with the latter supported by Antigonus and Ptolemy. Polyperchon allied himself to Eumenes in Asia, but was driven from Macedonia by Cassander, and fled to Epirus with the infant king Alexander IV and his mother Roxana. In Epirus he joined forces with Olympias, Alexander's mother, and together they invaded Macedon again. They were met by an army commanded by King Philip Arrhidaeus and his wife Eurydice, which immediately defected, leaving the king and Eurydice to Olympias's not so tender mercies, and they were killed (317 BC). Soon after, though, the tide turned, and Cassander was victorious, capturing and killing Olympias, and attaining control of Macedon, the boy king, and his mother.

=== Wars of the Diadochi (319–272 BC) ===
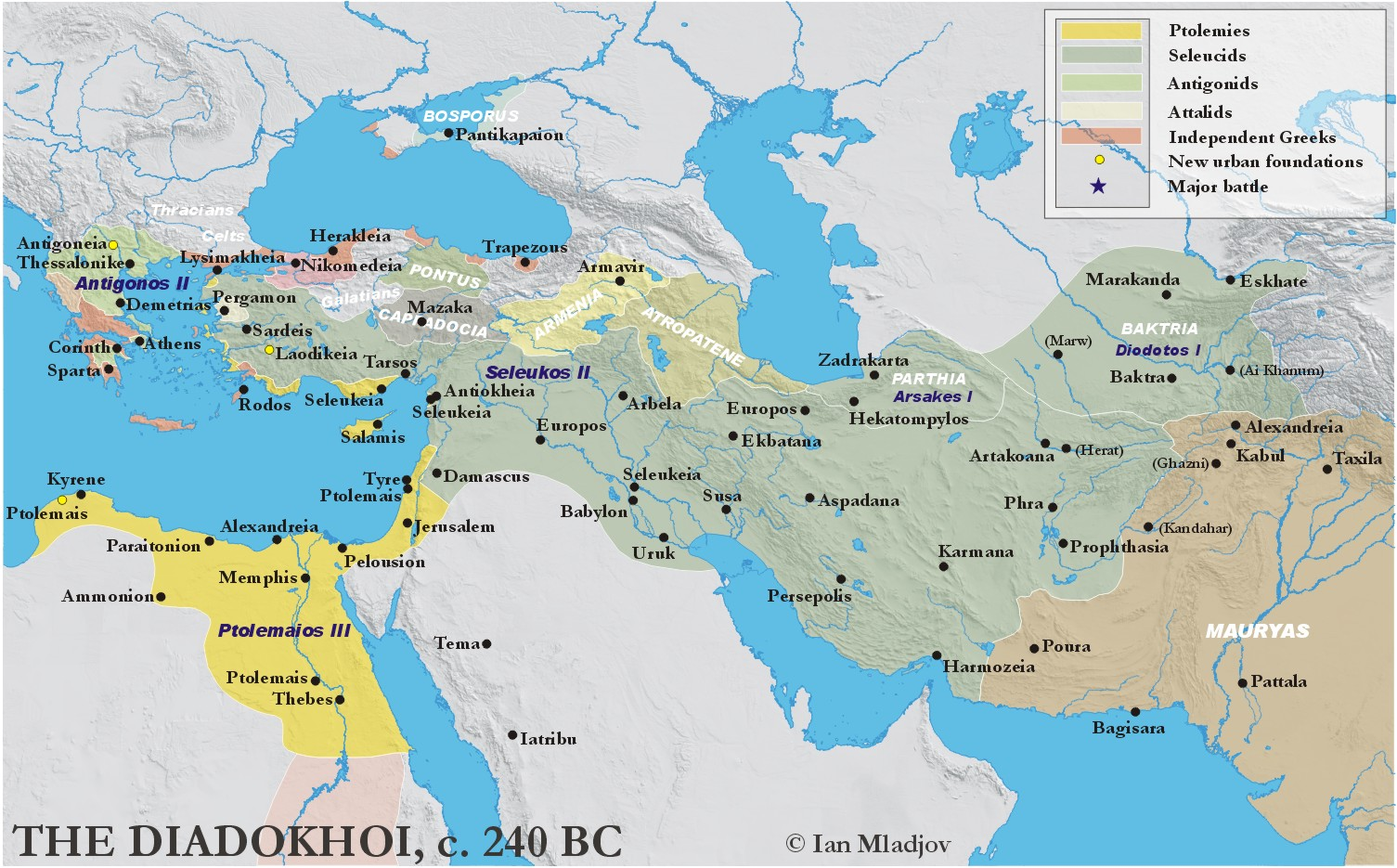
Hellenistic kingdoms as they existed in 240 BC, eight decades after the death of Alexander the Great

The Wars of the Diadochi were a series of conflicts, fought between 322 and 272 BC, over the rule of Alexander's empire after his death.

In 310 BC Cassander secretly murdered Alexander IV and Roxana.

==== The Battle of Ipsus (301 BC) ====
The Battle of Ipsus at the end of the Fourth War of the Diadochi finalized the breakup of the unified Empire of Alexander. Antigonus I Monophthalmus and his son Demetrius I of Macedon were pitted against the coalition of three other companions of Alexander: Cassander, ruler of Macedon; Lysimachus, ruler of Thrace; and Seleucus I Nicator, ruler of Babylonia and Persia. Antigonus was killed, but his son Demetrius took a large part of Macedonia and continued his father's dynasty. After the death of Cassander and Lysimachus, following one another in fairly rapid succession, the Ptolemies and Seleucids controlled the vast majority of Alexander's former empire, with a much smaller segment controlled by the Antigonid dynasty until the 1st century.

== The Epigoni ==
=== Kingdoms of the Diadochi (272–30 BC) ===
==== Ptolemaic Egypt ====
Under the rule of its first three monarchs Ptolemy I Soter, Ptolemy II Philadelphus, and Ptolemy III Euergetes, Ptolemaic Egypt reached its zenith of power and prestige in its first eighty years of existence, while heading off a number of crises and challenges along the way. The reign of Ptolemy IV Philopator (221–203 BC)is marked by historians as the beginning of the decline of Ptolemaic Egypt. However, the kingdom would persist for another 200 years.

The Ptolemaic rulers gradually embraced Egyptian traditions, such as sibling royal marriages, which the Ptolemaic dynasty frequently partook in. The cosmopolitan nature of Ptolemaic Egypt can be seen with the Rosetta Stone, an edict ordered by Ptolemy V Epiphanes (204–180 BC), would be written in three languages: Egyptian hieroglyphs, Coptic, and Greek. However, the Ptolemaic rulers' insistence on the incorporation of Greek influences into Egyptian society led to many peasant revolts and uprisings throughout the course of the kingdom's existence.

=== Decline and fall ===
This division was to last for a century, before the Antigonid Kingdom finally fell to the Roman Republic, and the Seleucids were harried from Persia by the Parthians and forced by the Romans to relinquish control in Asia Minor. A rump Seleucid kingdom survived in Syria until finally conquered by Pompey in 64 BC. The Ptolemies lasted longer in Alexandria, though as a client under Rome. Egypt was finally annexed to Rome in 30 BC.

== Historical uses as a title ==
=== Aulic ===
In the formal "court" titulature of the Hellenistic empires ruled by dynasties we know as Diadochs, the title was not customary for the Monarch, but has actually been proven to be the lowest in a system of official rank titles, known as Aulic titulature, conferred – ex officio or nominatim – to actual courtiers and as an honorary rank (for protocol) to various military and civilian officials. Notably in the Ptolemaic Kingdom, it was reported as the lowest aulic rank, under Philos, during the reign of Ptolemy V Epiphanes.

=== Modern concept ===
Diadochi (Διάδοχοι) is an ancient Greek word that currently modern scholars use to refer primarily to persons acting a role that existed only for a limited time period and within a limited geographic range. As there are no modern equivalents, it has been necessary to reconstruct the role from the ancient sources. There is no uniform agreement concerning exactly which historical persons fit the description, or the territorial range over which the role was in effect, or the calendar dates of the period. A certain basic meaning is included in all definitions, however.

The New Latin terminology was introduced by the historians of universal Greek history of the 19th century. Their comprehensive histories of ancient Greece typically covering from prehistory to the Roman Empire ran into many volumes. For example, George Grote in the first edition of History of Greece, 1846–1856, hardly mentions the Diadochi, except to say that they were kings who came after Alexander and Hellenized Asia. In the edition of 1869 he defines them as "great officers of Alexander, who after his death carved kingdoms for themselves out of his conquests."

Grote cites no references for the use of Diadochi but his criticism of Johann Gustav Droysen gives him away. Droysen, "the modern inventor of Hellenistic history," not only defined "Hellenistic period" (hellenistische ... Zeit), but in a further study of the "successors of Alexander" (nachfolger Alexanders) dated 1836, after Grote had begun work on his history, but ten years before publication of the first volume, divided it into two periods, "the age of the Diadochi," or "Diadochi Period" (die Zeit der Diodochen or Diadochenzeit), which ran from the death of Alexander to the end of the "Diadochi Wars" (Diadochenkämpfe, his term), about 278 BC, and the "Epigoni Period" (Epigonenzeit), which ran to about 220 BC. He also called the Diadochi Period "the Diadochi War Period" (Zeit der Diadochenkämpfe). The Epigoni he defined as "Sons of the Diadochi" (Diadochensöhne). These were the second generation of Diadochi rulers. In an 1843 work, "History of the Epigoni" (Geschichte der Epigonen) he details the kingdoms of the Epigoni, 280-239 BC. The only precise date is the first, the date of Alexander's death, June, 323 BC. It has never been in question.

Grote uses Droysen's terminology but gives him no credit for it. Instead he attacks Droysen's concept of Alexander planting Hellenism in eastern colonies: "Plutarch states that Alexander founded more than seventy new cities in Asia. So large a number of them is neither verifiable nor probable, unless we either reckon up simple military posts or borrow from the list of foundations really established by his successors." He avoids Droysen's term in favor of the traditional "successor". In a long note he attacks Droysen's thesis as "altogether slender and unsatisfactory." Grote may have been right, but he ignores entirely Droysen's main thesis, that the concepts of "successors" and "sons of successors" were innovated and perpetuated by historians writing contemporaneously or nearly so with the period. Not enough evidence survives to prove it conclusively, but enough survives to win acceptance for Droysen as the founding father of Hellenistic history.

M. M. Austin localizes what he considers to be a problem with Grote's view. To Grote's assertion in the Preface to his work that the period "is of no interest in itself," but serves only to elucidate "the preceding centuries," Austin comments "Few nowadays would subscribe to this view." If Grote was hoping to minimize Droysen by not giving him credit, he was mistaken, as Droysen's gradually became the majority model. By 1898 Adolf Holm incorporated a footnote describing and evaluating Droysen's arguments. He describes the Diadochi and Epigoni as "powerful individuals." The title of the volume on the topic, however, is The Graeco-Macedonian Age..., not Droysen's "Hellenistic".

Droysen's "Hellenistic" and "Diadochi Periods" are canonical today. A series of six (as of 2014) international symposia held at different universities 1997–2010 on the topics of the imperial Macedonians and their Diadochi have to a large degree solidified and internationalized Droysen's concepts. Each one grew out of the previous. Each published an assortment of papers read at the symposium. The 2010 symposium, entitled "The Time of the Diadochi (323-281 BC)," held at the University of A Coruña, Spain, represents the current concepts and investigations. The term Diadochi as an adjective is being extended beyond its original use, such as "Diadochi Chronicle," which is nowhere identified as such, or Diadochi kingdoms, "the kingdoms that emerged," even past the Age of the Epigoni.

== See also ==
- Pantodapoi
