= Drangiana =

Satrapy of the Achaemenid Persian Empire

Drangiana or Zarangiana (Greek: Δραγγιανή, Drangianē; also attested in Old Western Iranian as 𐏀𐎼𐎣, Zraka or Zranka) was a historical region and administrative division of the Achaemenid Empire. This region comprised territory around Hamun Lake, wetlands in endorheic Sistan Basin on the Iran–Afghan border, and its primary watershed Helmand River in the southwestern region of present-day Afghanistan. The historic Drangiana roughly corresponds to the modern Sistan region.

Drangiana

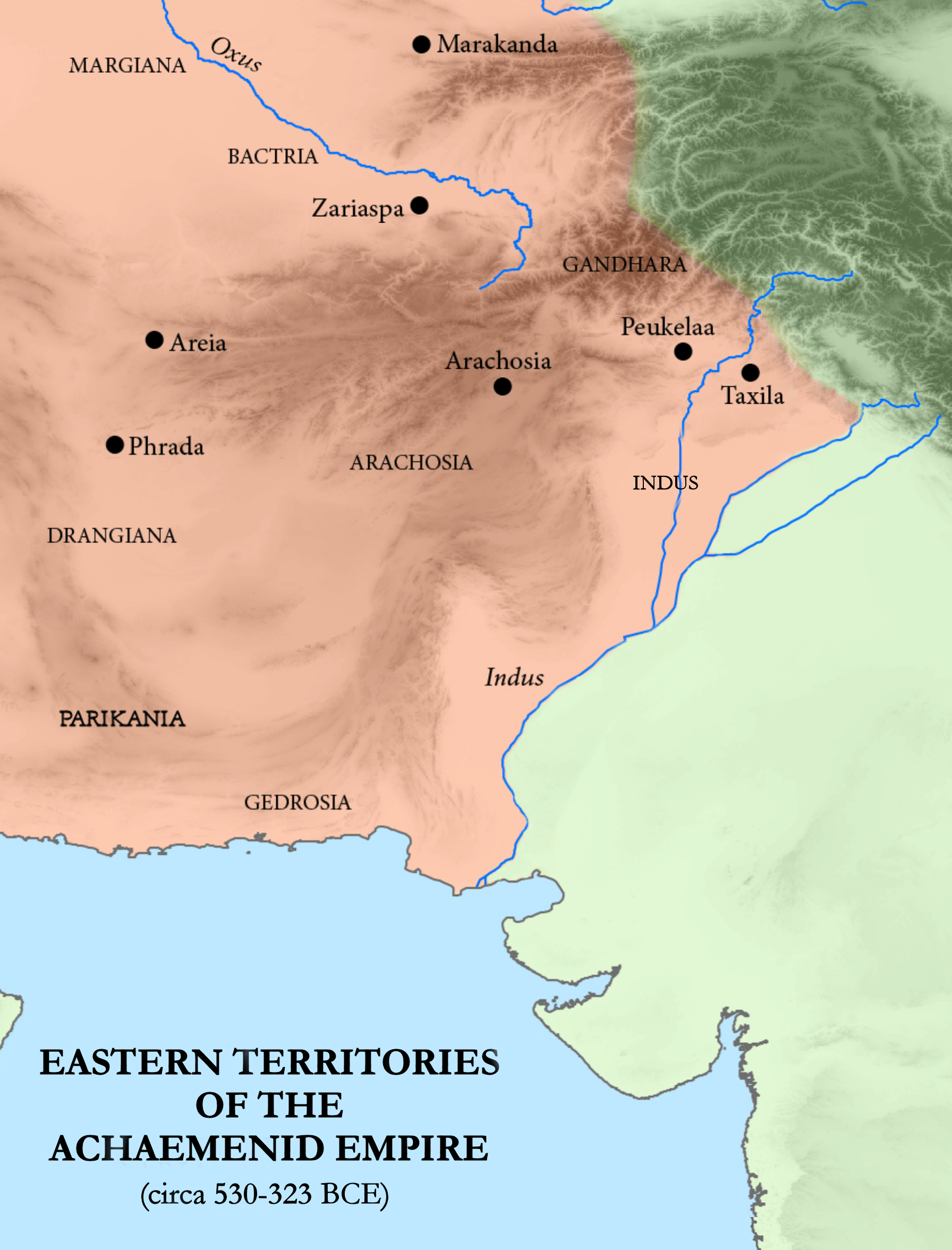
Eastern territories of the Achaemenid Empire, including Drangiana

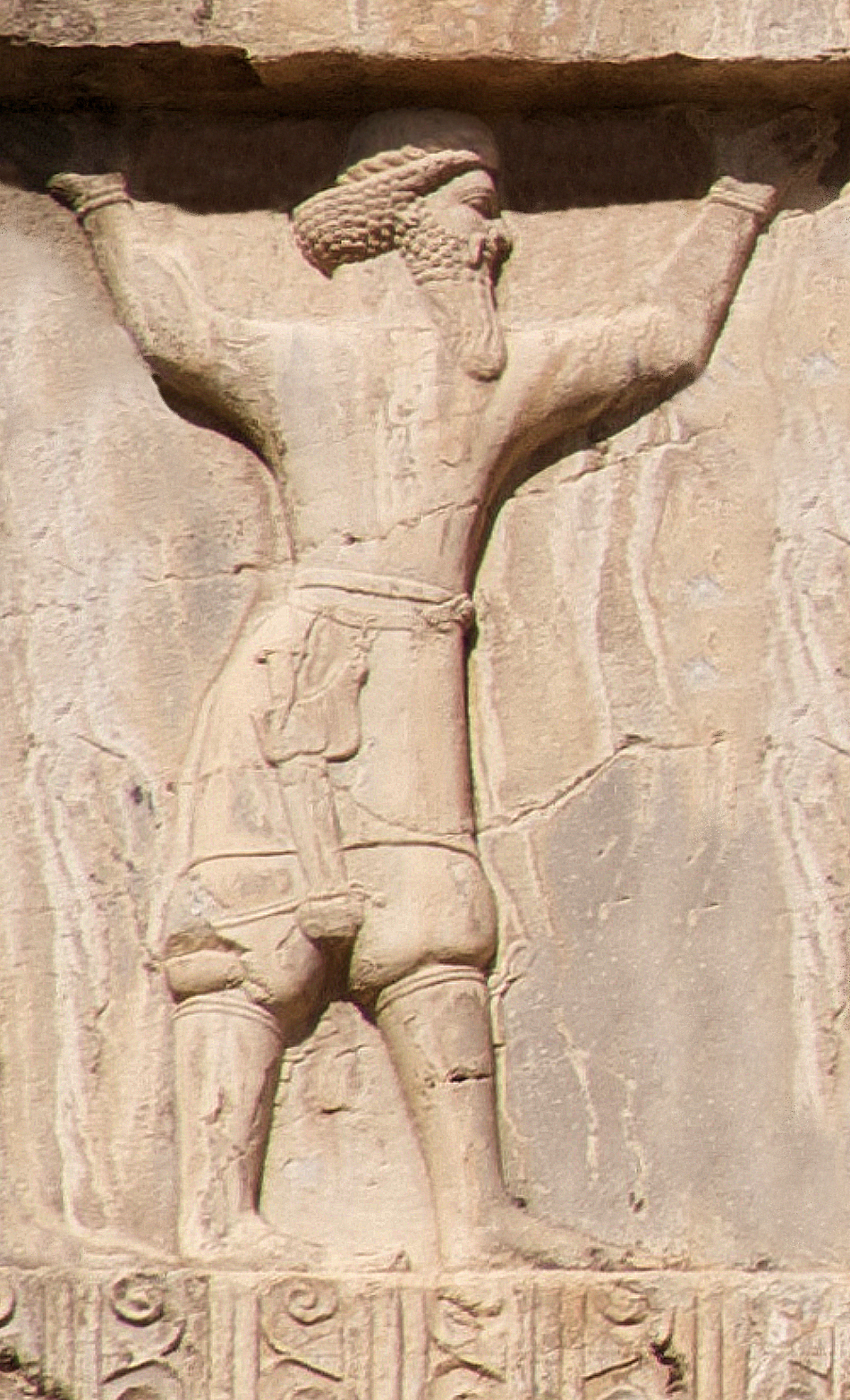
Drangiana soldier, circa 480 BCE. Xerxes I tomb

== History ==
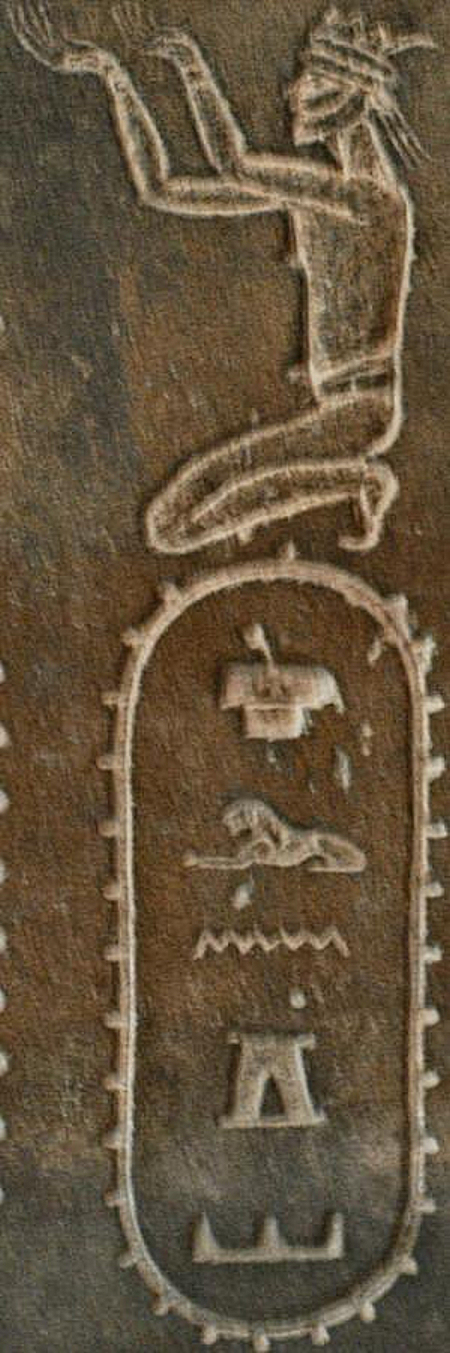
𓐠𓃭𓈖𓎼 S-rw-n-g "Zranka" i.e "Drangiana", on the Egyptian Statue of Darius I

In ancient times Drangiana was inhabited by an Iranian tribe which the ancient Greeks called Sarangians or Drangians. Drangiana was possibly subdued by another Iranian people, the Medes, and later, certainly, by the expanding Persian Achaemenid Empire of Cyrus the Great (559–530 BC). According to Herodotus, during the reign of Darius I (522–486 BC), the Drangians were placed in the same district as the Utians, Thamanaeans, Mycians, and those deported to the Persian Gulf. The capital of Drangiana, called Zarin or Zranka (like the Province), is identified with great probability with the extensive Achaemenid site of Dahan-e Gholaman southeast of Zabol in Iran. Another significant center was the city of Prophthasia, possibly located at modern Farah in Afghanistan. On occasion Drangiana was governed by the same satrap as neighboring Arachosia.

In 330–329 BC, the region was conquered by Alexander the Great. Drangiana continued to constitute an administrative district under Alexander and his successors. At Alexander's death in 323 BC, it was governed by Stasanor of Soloi, and later, in 321 BC, it was allotted to another Cypriot, Stasandros. By the end of the 4th century BC, Drangiana was a part of the Seleucid Empire, but in the second half of the 3rd century BC it was at least temporarily annexed by Euthydemos I of Bactria. In 206–205 BC Antiochos III (222–187 BC) seems to have recovered Drangiana for the Seleucids during his Anabasis. The history of Drangiana during the weakening of Seleucid rule is unclear, but by the mid-2nd century BC the area was conquered by the expanding Parthian Empire of the Arsacids.

Strabo noted that the Drangae (Δράγγαι) resemble the Persians (Πέρσης) in all respects in their mode of life except that they had little wine and that tin was found in the region. In modern times tin has been produced from the Hamadan region.
