= Macedonia (ancient kingdom) =

Ancient Greek kingdom in the southern Balkans

Macedonia Μακεδονία
- c. 7th century – 168 BC; 150–148 BC
- Vergina Sun

- The Kingdom of Macedonia in 336 BC (orange)
- Capital: Aigai (before 399 BC); Pella (399–168 BC)
- Common languages: Ancient Macedonian, Attic, Koine Greek
- Religion: Greek polytheism, Hellenistic religion
- Demonyms: Macedonian, Makedon
- Government: Hereditary monarchy
- Basileus
  - 498/497–454 BC: Alexander I
  - 454–413 BC: Perdiccas II
  - 413–399 BC: Archelaus
  - 359–336 BC: Philip II
  - 336–323 BC: Alexander the Great
  - 305–297 BC: Cassander
  - 294–288 BC: Demetrius I
  - 288–284 BC: Pyrrhus and Lysimachus
  - 272–239 BC: Antigonus II
  - 229–221 BC: Antigonus III
  - 221–179 BC: Philip V
  - 179–168 BC: Perseus (last)
- Legislature: Synedrion
- Historical era: Classical antiquity
  - Legendary foundation by Caranus or Perdiccas I: 7th century BC
  - Vassal of Persia: 512/511–493 BC
  - Incorporated into the Persian Empire: 492–479 BC
  - Rise of Macedon: 359–336 BC
  - Founding of the Hellenic League: 338–337 BC
  - Wars of Alexander the Great: 336–323 BC
  - Partition of Babylon: 323 BC
  - Wars of the Diadochi: 322–272 BC
  - Macedonian Wars: 214–148 BC
  - Battle of Pydna: 168 BC

Area
- 323 BC: 5,200,000 km^{2} (2,000,000 sq mi)
- Currency: Tetradrachm
Preceded by
Greek Dark Ages
Achaemenid Macedonia
League of Corinth
Achaemenid Empire
Pauravas
Succeeded by
Lysimachian Empire
Seleucid Empire
Ptolemaic Kingdom
Attalid kingdom
Macedonia province

Macedonia (/ˌmæsɪˈdoʊniə/ MASS-ih-DOH-nee-ə; Greek: Μακεδονία, Makedonía), also called Macedon (/ˈmæsɪdɒn/ MASS-ih-don), was an ancient kingdom on the periphery of Archaic and Classical Greece, which later became the dominant state of Hellenistic Greece. The kingdom was founded and initially ruled by the royal Argead dynasty, which was followed by the Antipatrid and Antigonid dynasties. Home to the ancient Macedonians, the earliest kingdom was centred on the northeastern part of the Greek peninsula, and bordered by Epirus to the southwest, Illyria to the northwest, Paeonia to the north, Thrace to the east and Thessaly to the south.

Before the 4th century BC, Macedonia was a small kingdom centered in Aegae, outside of the area dominated by the city-states of Athens, Sparta, and Thebes, and briefly subordinate to the Achaemenid Empire. During the reign of king Philip II (359–336 BC), Macedonia with its capital in Pella, subdued mainland Greece, Paeonia, and the Thracian Odrysian kingdom through conquest and diplomacy. With a reformed army containing phalanxes wielding the sarissa pike, Philip II defeated the old powers of Athens and Thebes at the Battle of Chaeronea in 338 BC. Philip II's son Alexander the Great, became king of Macedon and leader of the League of Corinth founded by his father, and accomplished the objective of commanding the whole of Greece when he destroyed Thebes when the city revolted. During Alexander's subsequent campaign of conquest, he overthrew the Achaemenid Empire and conquered territory that stretched as far as the Indus River. For a brief period, his Macedonian Empire was the most powerful in the world – the definitive Hellenistic state, inaugurating the transition to a new period of Ancient Greek civilization. Greek arts and literature flourished in the new conquered lands and advances in philosophy, engineering, and science spread across the empire and beyond. Of particular importance were the contributions of Aristotle, tutor to Alexander, whose writings became a keystone of Western philosophy.

After Alexander's death in 323 BC, the ensuing wars of the Diadochi, and the partitioning of Alexander's short-lived empire, Macedonia remained a Greek cultural and political centre in the Mediterranean region along with Ptolemaic Egypt, the Seleucid Empire, and the Attalid kingdom. Important cities included its capital Pella, Dion, Beroea, Pydna, and Amphipolis, while new cities were founded, such as Thessalonica by the usurper Cassander (named after his wife Thessalonike of Macedon). Macedonia's decline began with the Second Macedonian War and the rise of Rome as the leading Mediterranean power. At the end of the Third Macedonian War in 168 BC, the Macedonian monarchy was abolished and replaced by Roman client states. A short-lived revival of the monarchy during the Fourth Macedonian War in 150–148 BC ended with the establishment of the Roman province of Macedonia.

The Macedonian kings, who wielded absolute power and commanded state resources such as gold and silver, facilitated mining operations to mint currency, finance their armies and, by the reign of Philip II, a Macedonian navy. Unlike the other diadochi successor states, the imperial cult fostered by Alexander was never adopted in Macedonia, yet Macedonian rulers nevertheless assumed roles as high priests of the kingdom and leading patrons of domestic and international cults of the Hellenistic religion. The authority of Macedonian kings was theoretically limited by the institution of the army, while a few municipalities within the Macedonian commonwealth enjoyed a high degree of autonomy and even had democratic governments with popular assemblies.

== Etymology ==
The name Macedonia (Greek: Μακεδονία, Makedonía) comes from the ethnonym Μακεδόνες (Makedónes), which itself is derived from the ancient Greek adjective μακεδνός (makednós), meaning 'tall, slim', also the name of a people related to the Dorians (Herodotus), and possibly descriptive of Ancient Macedonians. It is most likely cognate with the adjective μακρός (makrós), meaning 'long' or 'tall' in ancient Greek. The name is believed to have originally meant either 'highlanders', 'the tall ones', or 'high grown men'. (Note: Engels 2010, p. 89; Borza 1995, p. 114; Eugene N. Borza writes that the "highlanders" or "Makedones" of the mountainous regions of western Macedonia are derived from northwest Greek stock; they were akin to those who at an earlier time may have migrated south to become the historical "Dorians".) Linguist Robert S. P. Beekes claims that both terms are of Pre-Greek substrate origin and cannot be explained in terms of Indo-European morphology; however Filip De Decker rejects Beekesʼ arguments as insufficient. The shorter English name variant Macedon developed in Middle English, based on a borrowing from the French form of the name, Macédoine.

== History ==
=== Early history and legend ===
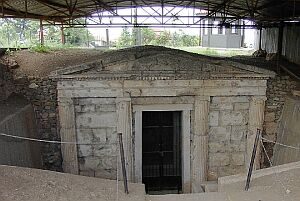
The entrance to one of the royal tombs at Vergina, a UNESCO World Heritage Site

The Classical Greek historians Herodotus and Thucydides reported the legend that the Macedonian kings of the Argead dynasty were descendants of Temenus, king of Argos, and could therefore claim the mythical Heracles as one of their ancestors as well as a direct lineage from Zeus, chief god of the Greek pantheon. Contradictory legends state that either Perdiccas I of Macedon or Caranus of Macedon were the founders of the Argead dynasty, with either five or eight kings before Amyntas I. The assertion that the Argeads descended from Temenus was accepted by the Hellanodikai authorities of the Ancient Olympic Games, permitting Alexander I of Macedon (r. 498–454 BC) to enter the competitions owing to his perceived Greek heritage. Little is known about the kingdom before the reign of Alexander I's father Amyntas I of Macedon (r. 547–498 BC) during the Archaic period.

The kingdom of Macedonia was initially situated along the Haliacmon and Loudias rivers in Lower Macedonia, north of Mount Olympus, east of the Vermio and Pierian mountain ranges, stretching along the coast of the Thermaic Gulf. Historian Robert Malcolm Errington suggests that one of the earliest Argead kings established Aigai (modern Vergina) as their capital in the mid-7th century BC. Before the 4th century BC, the kingdom covered a region corresponding roughly to the western and central parts of the region of Macedonia in modern Greece. It gradually expanded into the regions of Emathia, Pieria, Bottiaea, Almopia, Mygdonia, Crestonia, and Bisaltia, which were inhabited by various peoples such as Thracians and Phrygians, and into Eordaea and the rest of Upper Macedonia, inhabited by the Greek tribes of Lyncestae, Orestae, and Elimiotae. (Note: Lewis & Boardman 1994, pp. 723–724, see also Hatzopoulos 1996, pp. 105–108 for the Macedonian expulsion of original inhabitants such as the Phrygians.) Macedonia's non-Greek neighbours included Thracians, inhabiting territories to the northeast, Illyrians to the northwest, and Paeonians to the north, while the lands of Thessaly to the south and Epirus to the west were inhabited by Greeks with similar cultures to that of the Macedonians.

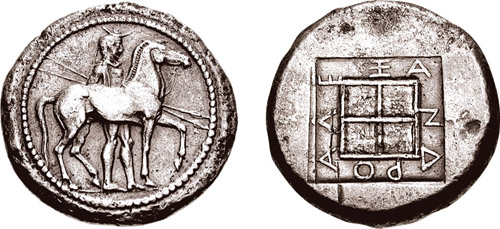
A silver octadrachm of Alexander I of Macedon (r. 498–454 BC), minted c. 465–460 BC, showing an equestrian figure wearing a chlamys (short cloak) and petasos (head cap) while holding two spears and leading a horse

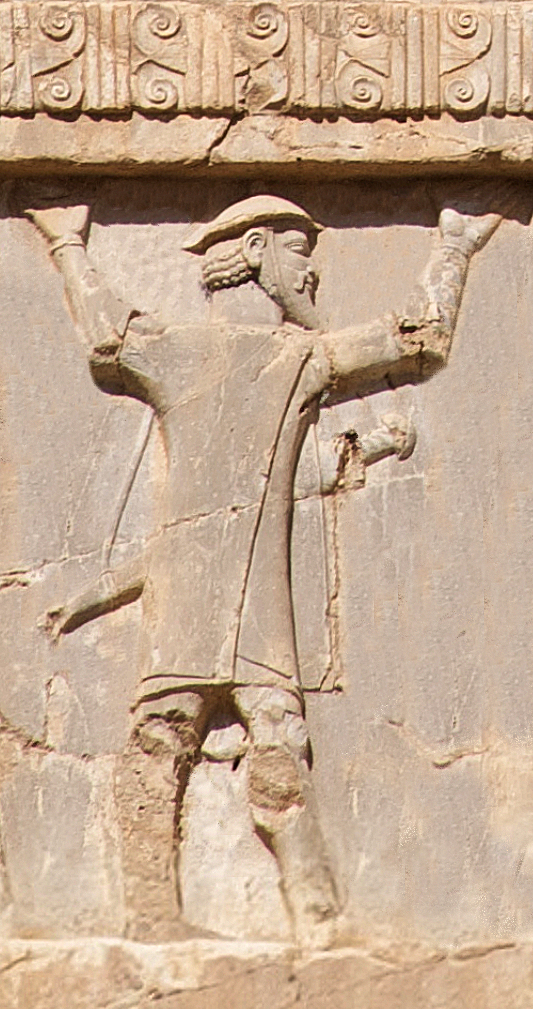
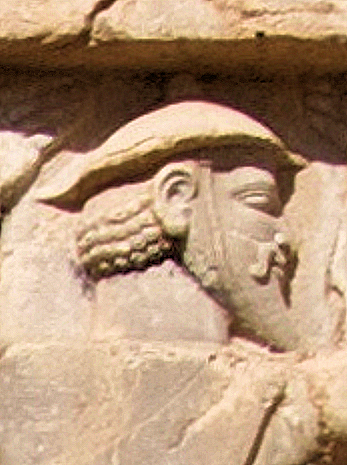
The "Ionians with shield-hats" (Old Persian cuneiform: 𐎹𐎢𐎴𐎠𐏐𐎫𐎣𐎲𐎼𐎠, Yaunā takabarā) depicted on the tomb of Xerxes I at Naqsh-e Rustam, were probably Macedonian soldiers in the service of the Achaemenid army, wearing the petasos or kausia, c. 480 BC.

A year after Darius I of Persia (r. 522–486 BC) launched an invasion into Europe against the Scythians, Paeonians, Thracians, and several Greek city-states in coastal Thrace, the Persian general Megabazus used diplomacy to convince Amyntas I to submit as a vassal of the Achaemenid Empire, ushering in the period of Achaemenid Macedonia. (Note: Olbrycht 2010, pp. 342–343; Sprawski 2010, pp. 131, 134; Errington 1990, pp. 8–9. Errington is skeptical that at this point Amyntas I of Macedon offered any submission as a vassal at all, at most a token one. He also mentions how the Macedonian king pursued his own course of action, such as inviting the exiled Athenian tyrant Hippias to take refuge at Anthemous in 506 BC.) Achaemenid Persian hegemony over Macedonia was briefly interrupted by the Ionian Revolt (499–493 BC), yet the Persian general Mardonius brought it back under Achaemenid suzerainty.

Although Macedonia enjoyed a large degree of autonomy and was never made a satrapy (i.e. province) of the Achaemenid Empire, it was expected to provide troops for the Achaemenid army. Alexander I provided Macedonian military support to Xerxes I (r. 486–465 BC) during the Second Persian invasion of Greece in 480–479 BC, and Macedonian soldiers fought on the side of the Persians at the 479 BC Battle of Platea. Following the Greek victory at Salamis in 480 BC, Alexander I was employed as an Achaemenid diplomat to propose a peace treaty and alliance with Athens, an offer that was rejected. Soon afterwards, the Achaemenid forces were forced to withdraw from mainland Europe, marking the end of Persian control over Macedonia.

=== Involvement in the Classical Greek world ===
Macedon (orange) during the Peloponnesian War around 431 BC, with Athens and the Delian League (yellow), Sparta and Peloponnesian League (red), independent states (blue), and the Persian Achaemenid Empire (purple)

Although initially a Persian vassal, Alexander I of Macedon fostered friendly diplomatic relations with his former Greek enemies, the Athenian and Spartan-led coalition of Greek city-states. His successor Perdiccas II (r. 454–413 BC) led the Macedonians to war in four separate conflicts against Athens, leader of the Delian League, while incursions by the Thracian ruler Sitalces of the Odrysian kingdom threatened Macedonia's territorial integrity in the northeast. The Athenian statesman Pericles promoted colonization of the Strymon River near the Kingdom of Macedonia, where the colonial city of Amphipolis was founded in 437/436 BC so that it could provide Athens with a steady supply of silver and gold as well as timber and pitch to support the Athenian navy. Initially Perdiccas II did not take any action and might have even welcomed the Athenians, as the Thracians were foes to both of them. This changed due to an Athenian alliance with a brother and cousin of Perdiccas II who had rebelled against him. Thus, two separate wars were fought against Athens between 433 and 431 BC. The Macedonian king retaliated by promoting the rebellion of Athens' allies in Chalcidice and subsequently won over the strategic city of Potidaea. After capturing the Macedonian cities Therma and Beroea, Athens besieged Potidaea but failed to overcome it; Therma was returned to Macedonia and much of Chalcidice to Athens in a peace treaty brokered by Sitalces, who provided Athens with military aid in exchange for acquiring new Thracian allies.

Perdiccas II sided with Sparta in the Peloponnesian War (431–404 BC) between Athens and Sparta, and in 429 BC Athens retaliated by persuading Sitalces to invade Macedonia, but he was forced to retreat owing to a shortage of provisions in winter. In 424 BC, Arrhabaeus, a local ruler of Lynkestis in Upper Macedonia, rebelled against his overlord Perdiccas, and the Spartans agreed to help in putting down the revolt. At the Battle of Lyncestis the Macedonians panicked and fled before the fighting began, enraging the Spartan general Brasidas, whose soldiers looted the unattended Macedonian baggage train. Perdiccas then changed sides and supported Athens, and he was able to put down Arrhabaeus's revolt.

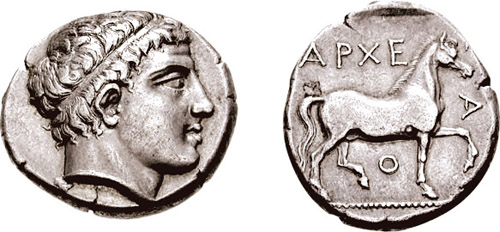
A Macedonian didrachm minted during the reign of Archelaus I of Macedon (r. 413–399 BC)

Brasidas died in 422 BC, the year Athens and Sparta struck an accord, the Peace of Nicias, that freed Macedonia from its obligations as an Athenian ally. Following the 418 BC Battle of Mantinea, the victorious Spartans formed an alliance with Argos, a military pact Perdiccas II was keen to join given the threat of Spartan allies remaining in Chalcidice. When Argos suddenly switched sides as a pro-Athenian democracy, the Athenian navy was able to form a blockade against Macedonian seaports and invade Chalcidice in 417 BC. Perdiccas II sued for peace in 414 BC, forming an alliance with Athens that was continued by his son and successor Archelaus I (r. 413–399 BC). Athens then provided naval support to Archelaus I in the 410 BC Macedonian siege of Pydna, in exchange for timber and naval equipment.

Although Archelaus I was faced with some internal revolts and had to fend off an invasion of Illyrians led by Sirras of Lynkestis, he was able to project Macedonian power into Thessaly where he sent military aid to his allies. Although he retained Aigai as a ceremonial and religious centre, Archelaus I moved the capital of the kingdom north to Pella, which was then positioned by a lake with a river connecting it to the Aegean Sea. He improved Macedonia's currency by minting coins with a higher silver content as well as issuing separate copper coinage. His royal court attracted the presence of well-known intellectuals such as the Athenian playwright Euripides. When Archelaus I was assassinated (perhaps following a homosexual love affair with royal pages at his court), the kingdom was plunged into chaos, in an era lasting from 399 to 393 BC that included the reign of four different monarchs: Orestes, son of Archelaus I; Aeropus II, uncle, regent, and murderer of Orestes; Pausanias, son of Aeropus II; and Amyntas II, who was married to the youngest daughter of Archelaus I. Very little is known about this turbulent period; it came to an end when Amyntas III (r. 393–370 BC), son of Arrhidaeus and grandson of Amyntas I, killed Pausanias and claimed the Macedonian throne.

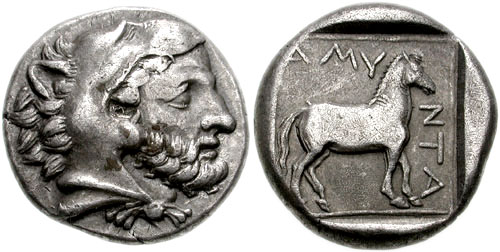
A silver stater of Amyntas III of Macedon (r. 393–370 BC)

Amyntas III was forced to flee his kingdom in either 393 or 383 BC (based on conflicting accounts), owing to a massive invasion by the Illyrians led by Bardylis. (Note: Roisman 2010, pp. 158–159; see also Errington 1990, p. 30 for further details; the Greek historian Diodorus Siculus provided a seemingly conflicting account about Illyrian invasions occurring in 393 BC and 383 BC, which may have been representative of a single invasion led by the Illyrian king Bardylis.) The pretender to the throne Argaeus ruled in his absence, yet Amyntas III eventually returned to his kingdom with the aid of Thessalian allies. Amyntas III was also nearly overthrown by the forces of the Chalcidian city of Olynthos, but with the aid of Teleutias, brother of the Spartan king Agesilaus II, the Macedonians forced Olynthos to surrender and dissolve their Chalcidian League in 379 BC.

Alexander II (r. 370–368 BC), son of Eurydice I and Amyntas III, succeeded his father and immediately invaded Thessaly to wage war against the tagus (supreme Thessalian military leader) Alexander of Pherae, capturing the city of Larissa. The Thessalians, desiring to remove both Alexander II and Alexander of Pherae as their overlords, appealed to Pelopidas of Thebes for aid; he succeeded in recapturing Larissa and, in the peace agreement arranged with Macedonia, received aristocratic hostages including Alexander II's brother and future king Philip II (r. 359–336 BC). When Alexander was assassinated by his brother-in-law Ptolemy of Aloros, the latter acted as an overbearing regent for Perdiccas III (r. 368–359 BC), younger brother of Alexander II, who eventually had Ptolemy executed when reaching the age of majority in 365 BC. The remainder of Perdiccas III's reign was marked by political stability and financial recovery. However, an Athenian invasion led by Timotheus, son of Conon, captured Methone and Pydna, and an Illyrian invasion led by Bardylis succeeded in killing Perdiccas III and 4,000 Macedonian troops in battle.

=== Rise of Macedon ===
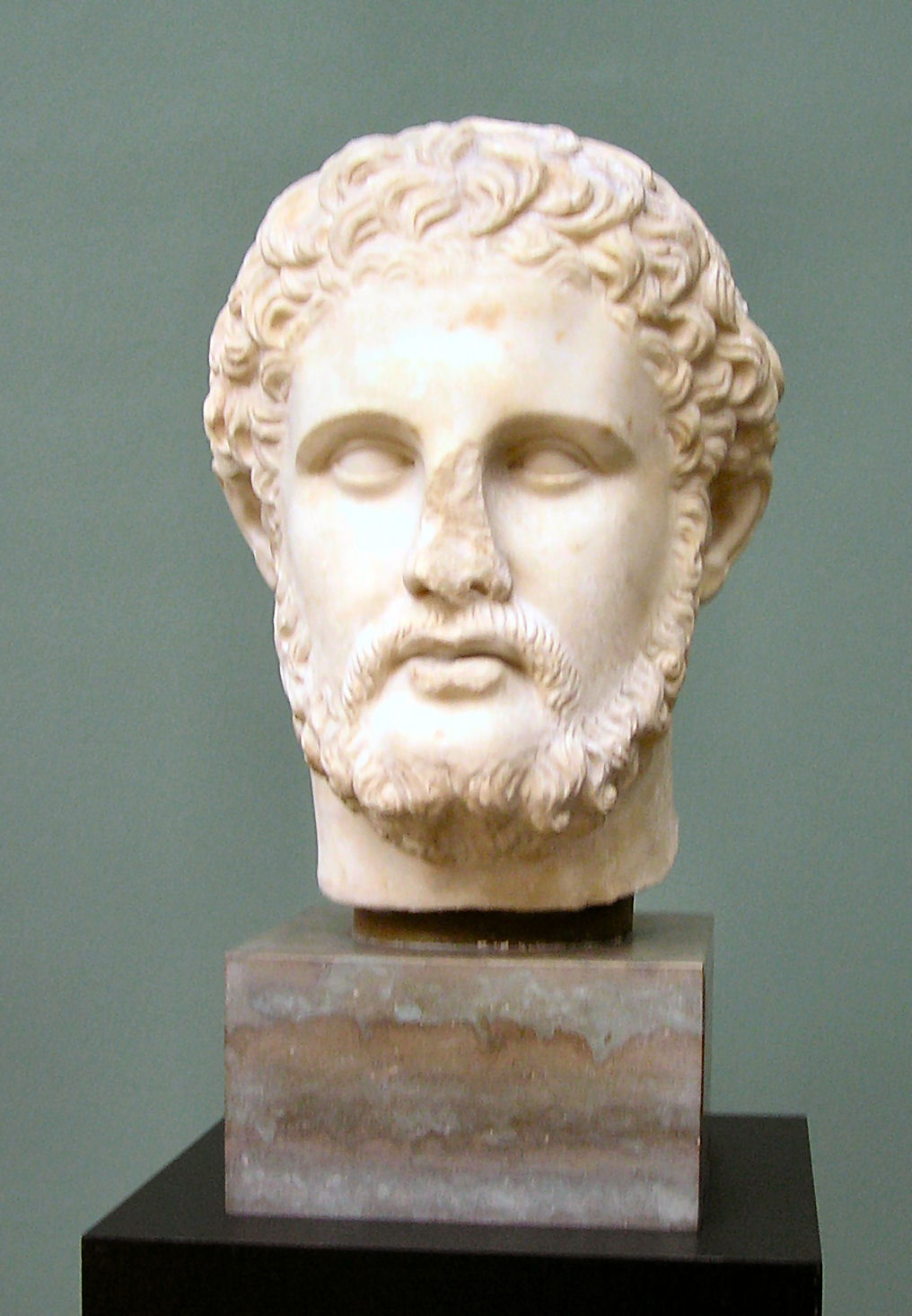
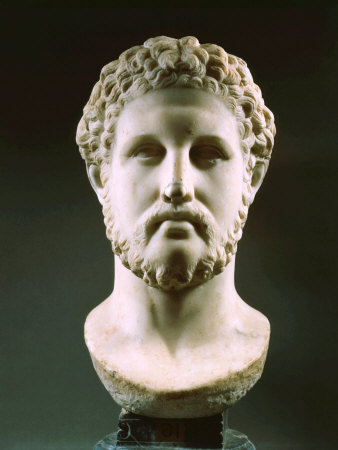
Left, a bust of Philip II of Macedon (r. 359–336 BC) from the Hellenistic period, located at Ny Carlsberg Glyptotek. Right, another bust of Philip II, a 1st-century AD Roman copy of a Hellenistic Greek original, now in the Vatican Museums.

Map of the Kingdom of Macedon at the death of Philip II in 336 BC (light blue), with the original territory that existed in 431 BC (red outline), and dependent states (yellow)

Philip II was twenty-four years old when he acceded to the throne in 359 BC. Through the use of deft diplomacy, he was able to convince the Thracians under Berisades to cease their support of Pausanias, a pretender to the throne, and the Athenians to halt their support of another pretender. He achieved these by bribing the Thracians and their Paeonian allies and establishing a treaty with Athens that relinquished his claims to Amphipolis. He was also able to make peace with the Illyrians who had threatened his borders.

Philip II spent his initial years radically transforming the Macedonian army. A reform of its organization, equipment, and training, including the introduction of the Macedonian phalanx armed with long pikes (i.e. the sarissa), proved immediately successful when tested against his Illyrian and Paeonian enemies. Confusing accounts in ancient sources have led modern scholars to debate how much Philip II's royal predecessors may have contributed to these reforms and the extent to which his ideas were influenced by his adolescent years of captivity in Thebes as a political hostage during the Theban hegemony, especially after meeting with the general Epaminondas.

The Macedonians, like the other Greeks, traditionally practised monogamy, but Philip II practised polygamy and married seven wives with perhaps only one that did not involve the loyalty of his aristocratic subjects or new allies. (Note: Müller 2010, pp. 169–170, 179. Müller is skeptical about the claims of Plutarch and Athenaeus that Philip II of Macedon married Cleopatra Eurydice of Macedon, a younger woman, purely out of love or due to his own midlife crisis. Cleopatra was the daughter of the general Attalus, who along with his father-in-law Parmenion were given command posts in Asia Minor (modern Turkey) soon after this wedding. Müller also suspects that this marriage was one of political convenience meant to ensure the loyalty of an influential Macedonian noble house.) His first marriages were to Phila of Elimeia of the Upper Macedonian aristocracy as well as the Illyrian princess Audata to ensure a marriage alliance. To establish an alliance with Larissa in Thessaly, he married the Thessalian noblewoman Philinna in 358 BC, who bore him a son who would later rule as Philip III Arrhidaeus (r. 323–317 BC). In 357 BC, he married Olympias to secure an alliance with Arybbas, the king of Epirus and the Molossians. This marriage would bear a son who would later rule as Alexander III (better known as Alexander the Great) and claim descent from the legendary Achilles by way of his dynastic heritage from Epirus. It is unclear whether or not the Achaemenid Persian kings influenced Philip II's practice of polygamy, although his predecessor Amyntas III had three sons with a possible second wife Gygaea: Archelaus, Arrhidaeus, and Menelaus. Philip II had Archelaus put to death in 359 BC, while Philip II's other two half brothers fled to Olynthos, serving as a casus belli for the Olynthian War (349–348 BC) against the Chalcidian League.

While Athens was preoccupied with the Social War (357–355 BC), Philip II retook Amphipolis from them in 357 BC and the following year recaptured Pydna and Potidaea, the latter of which he handed over to the Chalcidian League as promised in a treaty. In 356 BC, he took Crenides, refounding it as Philippi, while his general Parmenion defeated the Illyrian king Grabos II of the Grabaei. During the 355–354 BC siege of Methone, Philip II lost his right eye to an arrow wound, but managed to capture the city and treated the inhabitants cordially, unlike the Potidaeans, who had been enslaved. (Note: Müller 2010, pp. 171–172; Buckler 1989, pp. 63, 176–181; Cawkwell 1978, pp. 185–187. Cawkwell contrarily provides the date of this siege as 354–353 BC.)

Philip II then involved Macedonia in the Third Sacred War (356–346 BC). It began when Phocis captured and plundered the temple of Apollo at Delphi instead of submitting unpaid fines, causing the Amphictyonic League to declare war on Phocis and a civil war among the members of the Thessalian League aligned with either Phocis or Thebes. Philip II's initial campaign against Pherae in Thessaly in 353 BC at the behest of Larissa ended in two disastrous defeats by the Phocian general Onomarchus. (Note: Müller 2010, pp. 172–173; Cawkwell 1978, pp. 60, 185; Hornblower 2002, p. 272; Buckler 1989, pp. 63–64, 176–181. Conversely, Buckler provides the date of this initial campaign as 354 BC, while affirming that the second Thessalian campaign ending in the Battle of Crocus Field occurred in 353 BC.) Philip II in turn defeated Onomarchus in 352 BC at the Battle of Crocus Field, which led to Philip II's election as leader (archon) of the Thessalian League, provided him a seat on the Amphictyonic Council, and allowed for a marriage alliance with Pherae by wedding Nicesipolis, niece of the tyrant Jason of Pherae.

Philip II had some early involvement with the Achaemenid Empire, especially by supporting satraps and mercenaries who rebelled against the central authority of the Achaemenid king. The satrap of Hellespontine Phrygia Artabazos II, who was in rebellion against Artaxerxes III, was able to take refuge as an exile at the Macedonian court from 352 to 342 BC. He was accompanied in exile by his family and by his mercenary general Memnon of Rhodes. Barsine, daughter of Artabazos, and future wife of Alexander the Great, grew up at the Macedonian court.

After campaigning against the Thracian ruler Cersobleptes, in 349 BC, Philip II began his war against the Chalcidian League, which had been reestablished in 375 BC following a temporary disbandment. Despite an Athenian intervention by Charidemus, Olynthos was captured by Philip II in 348 BC, and its inhabitants were sold into slavery, including some Athenian citizens. The Athenians, especially in a series of speeches by Demosthenes known as the Olynthiacs, were unsuccessful in persuading their allies to counterattack and in 346 BC concluded a treaty with Macedonia known as the Peace of Philocrates. The treaty stipulated that Athens would relinquish claims to Macedonian coastal territories, the Chalcidice, and Amphipolis in return for the release of the enslaved Athenians as well as guarantees that Philip II would not attack Athenian settlements in the Thracian Chersonese. Meanwhile, Phocis and Thermopylae were captured by Macedonian forces, the Delphic temple robbers were executed, and Philip II was awarded the two Phocian seats on the Amphictyonic Council and the position of master of ceremonies over the Pythian Games. Athens initially opposed his membership on the council and refused to attend the games in protest, but they eventually accepted these conditions, perhaps after some persuasion by Demosthenes in his oration On the Peace.

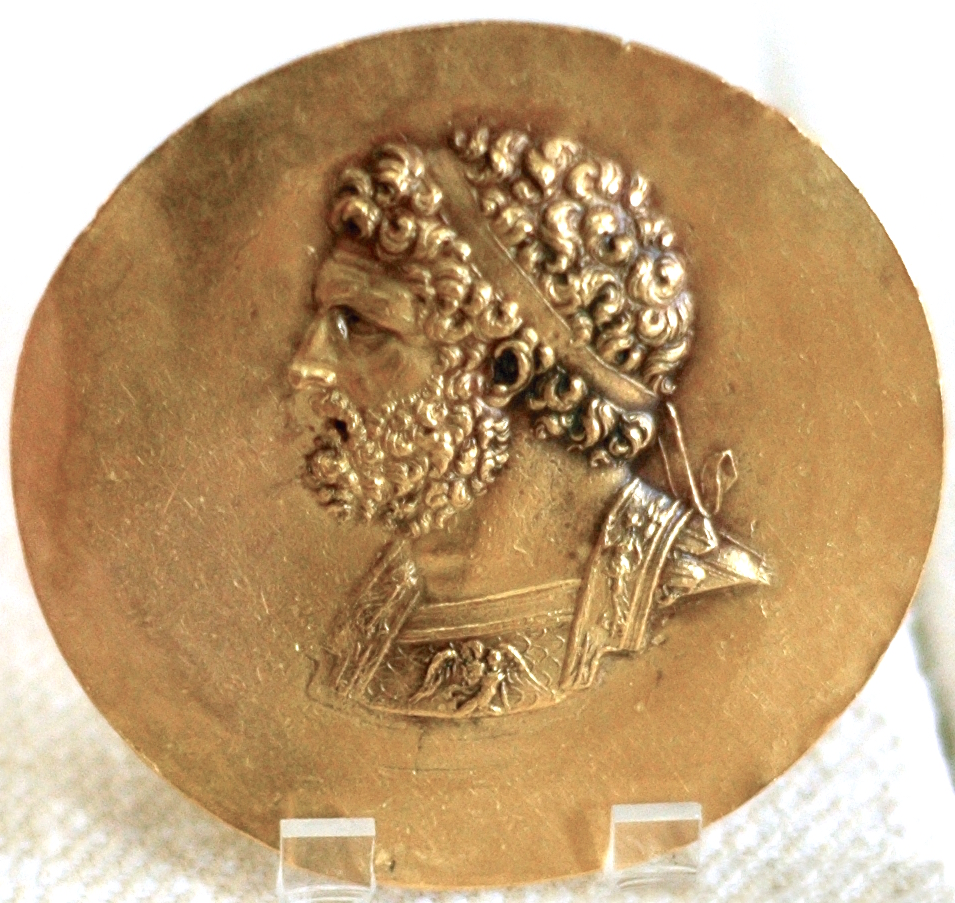
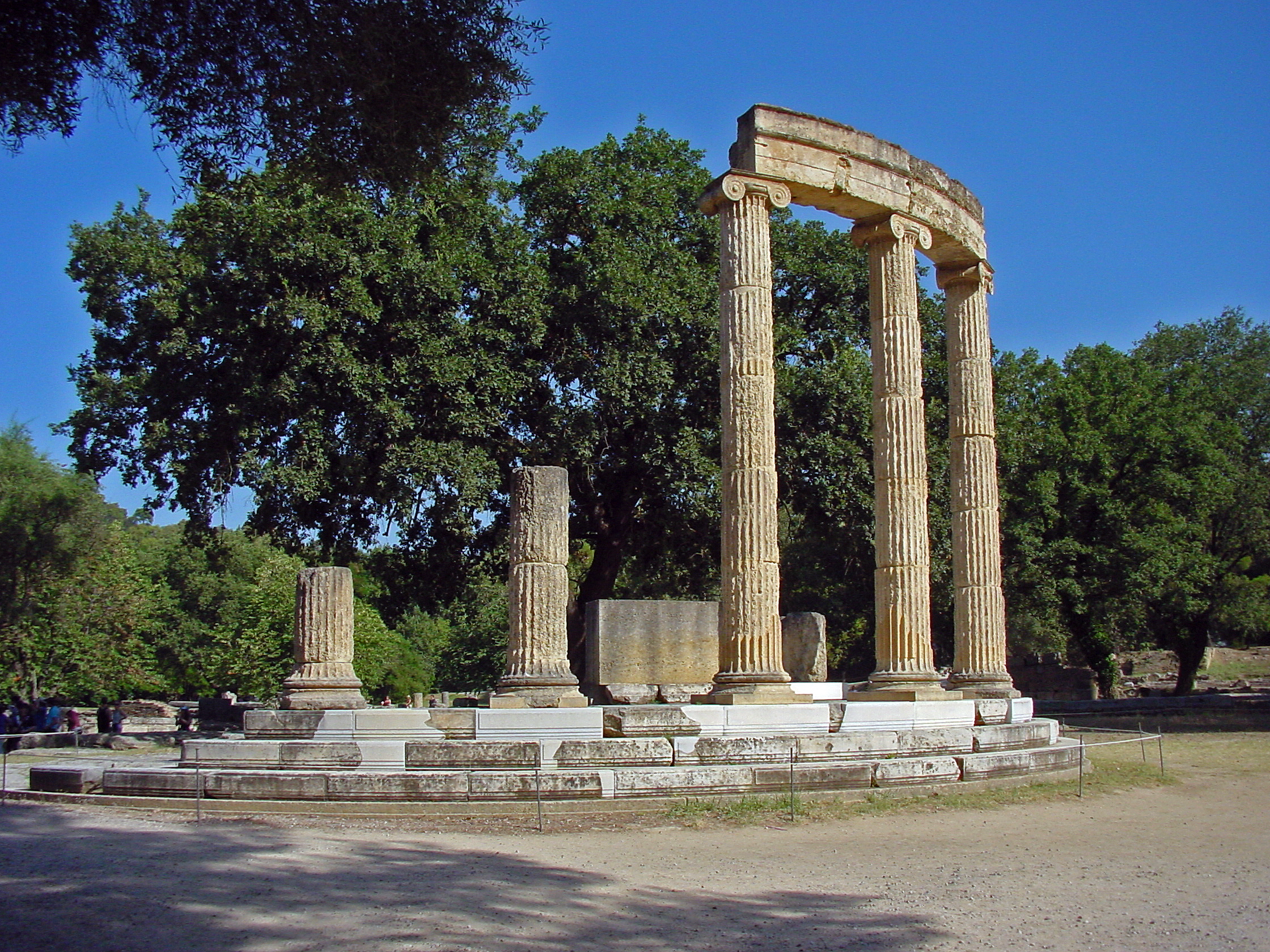
Left, a Niketerion (victory medallion) bearing the effigy of king Philip II of Macedon, 3rd century AD, probably minted during the reign of Roman Emperor Alexander Severus. Right, the ruins of the Philippeion at Olympia, Greece, which was built by Philip II of Macedon to celebrate his victory at the Battle of Chaeronea in 338 BC.

Over the next few years, Philip II reformed local governments in Thessaly, campaigned against the Illyrian ruler Pleuratus I, deposed Arybbas in Epirus in favour of his brother-in-law Alexander I (through Philip II's marriage to Olympias), and defeated Cersebleptes in Thrace. This allowed him to extend Macedonian control over the Hellespont in anticipation of an invasion into Achaemenid Anatolia. In 342 BC, Philip II conquered a Thracian city in what is now Bulgaria and renamed it Philippopolis (modern Plovdiv). War broke out with Athens in 340 BC while Philip II was engaged in two ultimately unsuccessful sieges of Perinthus and Byzantion, followed by a successful campaign against the Scythians along the Danube and Macedonia's involvement in the Fourth Sacred War against Amphissa in 339 BC. Thebes ejected a Macedonian garrison from Nicaea (near Thermopylae), leading Thebes to join Athens, Megara, Corinth, Achaea, and Euboea in a final confrontation against Macedonia at the Battle of Chaeronea in 338 BC. After the Macedonian victory at Chaeronea, Philip II installed an oligarchy in Thebes, yet was lenient toward Athens, wishing to utilize their navy in a planned invasion of the Achaemenid Empire. He was then chiefly responsible for the formation of the League of Corinth that included the major Greek city-states except Sparta. Despite the Kingdom of Macedonia's official exclusion from the league, in 337 BC, Philip II was elected as the leader (hegemon) of its council (synedrion) and the commander-in-chief (strategos autokrator) of a forthcoming campaign to invade the Achaemenid Empire which he presented as punishing the Persians for the suffering of the Greeks and liberating the Greek cities of Asia Minor. The Persians offered aid to Perinthus and Byzantion in 341–340 BC, highlighting Macedonia's strategic need to secure Thrace and the Aegean Sea against increasing Achaemenid encroachment, as the Persian king Artaxerxes III further consolidated his control over satrapies in western Anatolia. The latter region, yielding far more wealth and valuable resources than the Balkans, was also coveted by the Macedonian king for its sheer economic potential.

When Philip II married Cleopatra Eurydice, niece of general Attalus, talk of providing new potential heirs at the wedding feast infuriated Philip II's son Alexander, a veteran of the Battle of Chaeronea, and his mother Olympias. They fled together to Epirus before Alexander was recalled to Pella by Philip II. When Philip II arranged a marriage between his son Arrhidaeus and Ada of Caria, daughter of Pixodarus, the Persian satrap of Caria, Alexander intervened and proposed to marry Ada instead. Philip II then cancelled the wedding altogether and exiled Alexander's advisors Ptolemy, Nearchus, and Harpalus. To reconcile with Olympias, Philip II had their daughter Cleopatra marry Olympias' brother (and Cleopatra's uncle) Alexander I of Epirus, but Philip II was assassinated by his bodyguard, Pausanias of Orestis, during their wedding feast and succeeded by Alexander in 336 BC.

=== Alexander's Empire ===
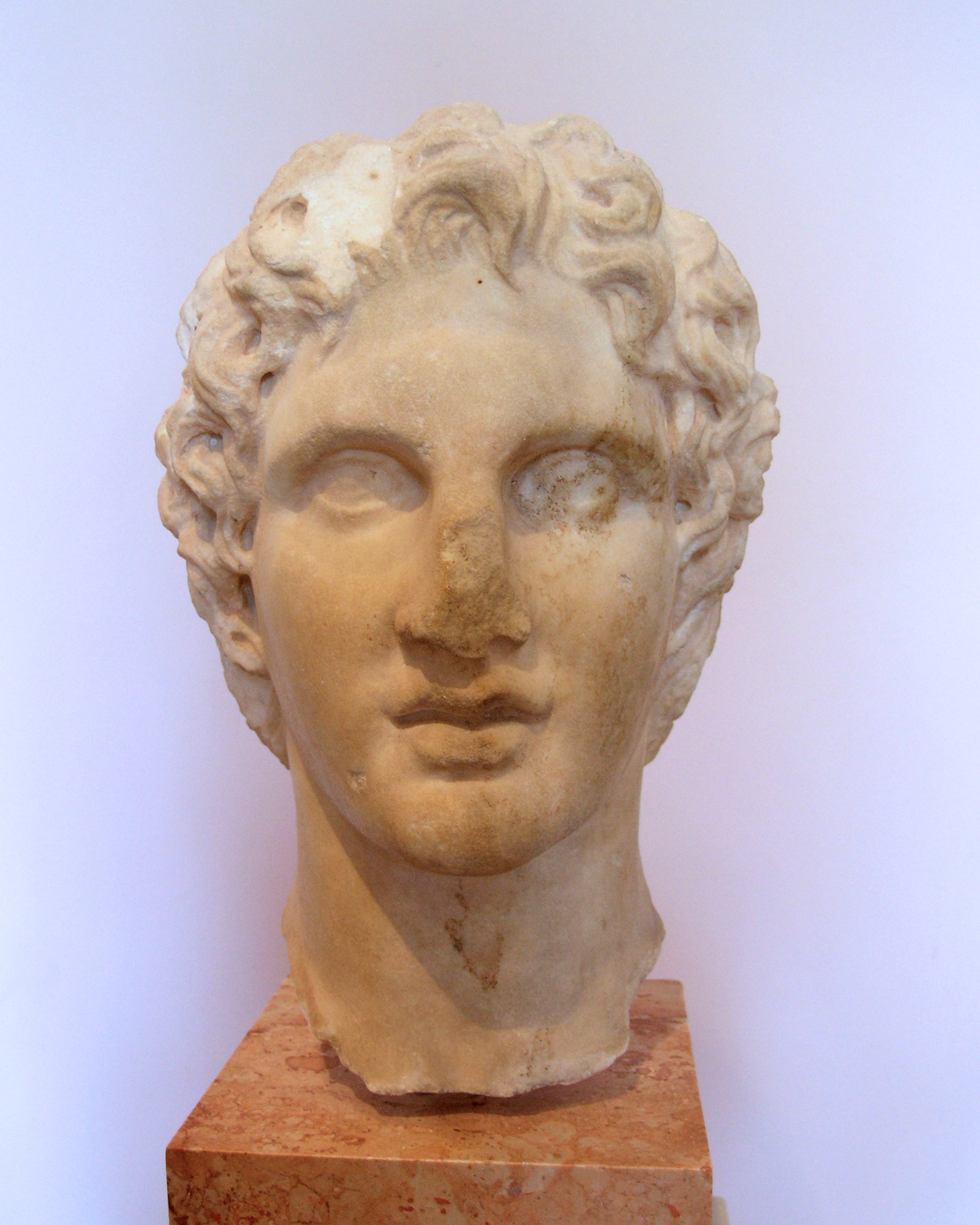
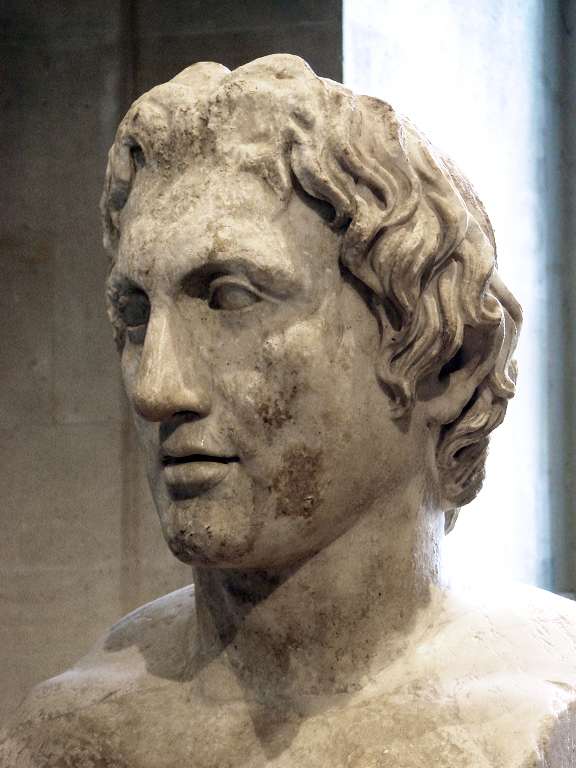
Left, Bust of Alexander the Great by the Athenian sculptor Leochares, 330 BC, Acropolis Museum, Athens. Right, Bust of Alexander the Great, a Roman copy of the Imperial Era (1st or 2nd century AD) after an original bronze sculpture made by the Greek sculptor Lysippos, Louvre, Paris.

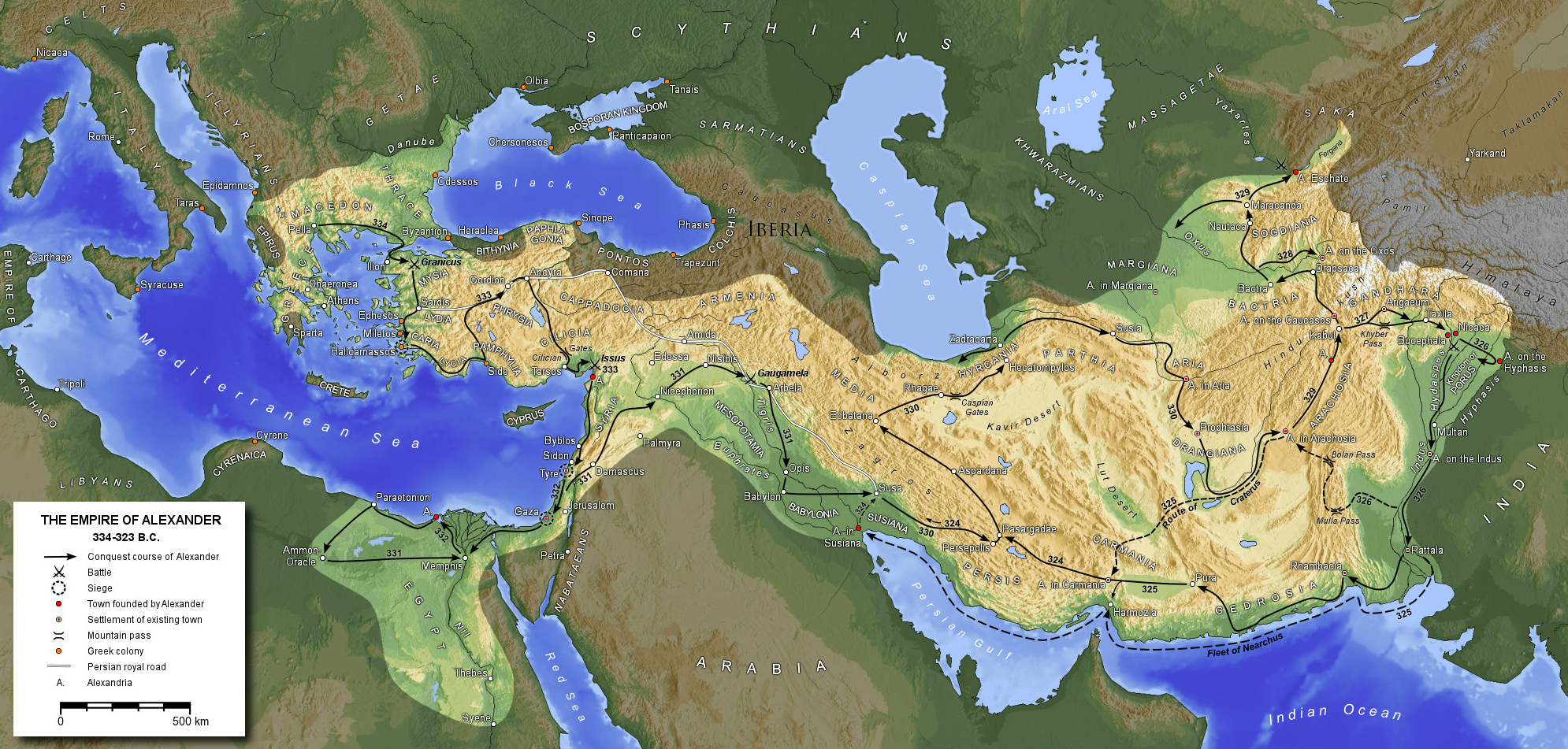
Alexander's empire and his route

Modern scholars have argued over the possible role of Alexander III "the Great" and his mother Olympias in the assassination of Philip II, noting the latter's choice to exclude Alexander from his planned invasion of Asia, choosing instead for him to act as regent of Greece and deputy hegemon of the League of Corinth, and the potential bearing of another male heir between Philip II and his new wife, Cleopatra Eurydice. (Note: Gilley & Worthington 2010, pp. 189–190; Müller 2010, p. 183. Without implicating Alexander III of Macedon as a potential suspect in the plot to assassinate Philip II of Macedon, N. G. L. Hammond and F. W. Walbank discuss possible Macedonian as well as foreign suspects, such as Demosthenes and Darius III: Hammond & Walbank 2001, pp. 8–12.) Alexander III (r. 336–323 BC) was immediately proclaimed king by an assembly of the army and leading aristocrats, chief among them being Antipater and Parmenion. By the end of his reign and military career in 323 BC, Alexander would rule over an empire consisting of mainland Greece, Asia Minor, the Levant, ancient Egypt, Mesopotamia, Persia, and much of Central and South Asia (i.e. modern Pakistan). Among his first acts was the burial of his father at Aigai. The members of the League of Corinth revolted at the news of Philip II's death, but were soon quelled by military force alongside persuasive diplomacy, electing Alexander as hegemon of the league to carry out the planned invasion of Achaemenid Persia.

In 335 BC, Alexander fought against the Thracian tribe of the Triballi at Haemus Mons and along the Danube, forcing their surrender on Peuce Island. Shortly thereafter, the Illyrian chieftain Cleitus, son of Bardylis, threatened to attack Macedonia with the aid of Glaucias, king of the Taulantii, but Alexander took the initiative and besieged the Illyrians at Pelion (in modern Albania). When Thebes had once again revolted from the League of Corinth and was besieging the Macedonian garrison in the Cadmea, Alexander left the Illyrian front and marched to Thebes, which he placed under siege. After breaching the walls, Alexander's forces killed 6,000 Thebans, took 30,000 inhabitants as prisoners of war, and burned the city to the ground as a warning that convinced all other Greek states except Sparta not to challenge Alexander again.

Throughout his military career, Alexander won every battle that he personally commanded. His first victory against the Persians in Asia Minor at the Battle of the Granicus in 334 BC used a small cavalry contingent as a distraction to allow his infantry to cross the river followed by a cavalry charge from his companion cavalry. Alexander led the cavalry charge at the Battle of Issus in 333 BC, forcing the Persian king Darius III and his army to flee. Darius III, despite having superior numbers, was again forced to flee the Battle of Gaugamela in 331 BC. The Persian king was later captured and executed by his own satrap of Bactria and kinsman, Bessus, in 330 BC. The Macedonian king subsequently hunted down and executed Bessus in what is now Afghanistan, securing the region of Sogdia in the process. At the 326 BC Battle of the Hydaspes (modern-day Punjab), when the war elephants of King Porus of the Pauravas threatened Alexander's troops, he had them form open ranks to surround the elephants and dislodge their handlers by using their sarissa pikes. When his Macedonian troops threatened mutiny in 324 BC at Opis, Babylonia (near modern Baghdad, Iraq), Alexander offered Macedonian military titles and greater responsibilities to Persian officers and units instead, forcing his troops to seek forgiveness at a staged banquet of reconciliation between Persians and Macedonians.

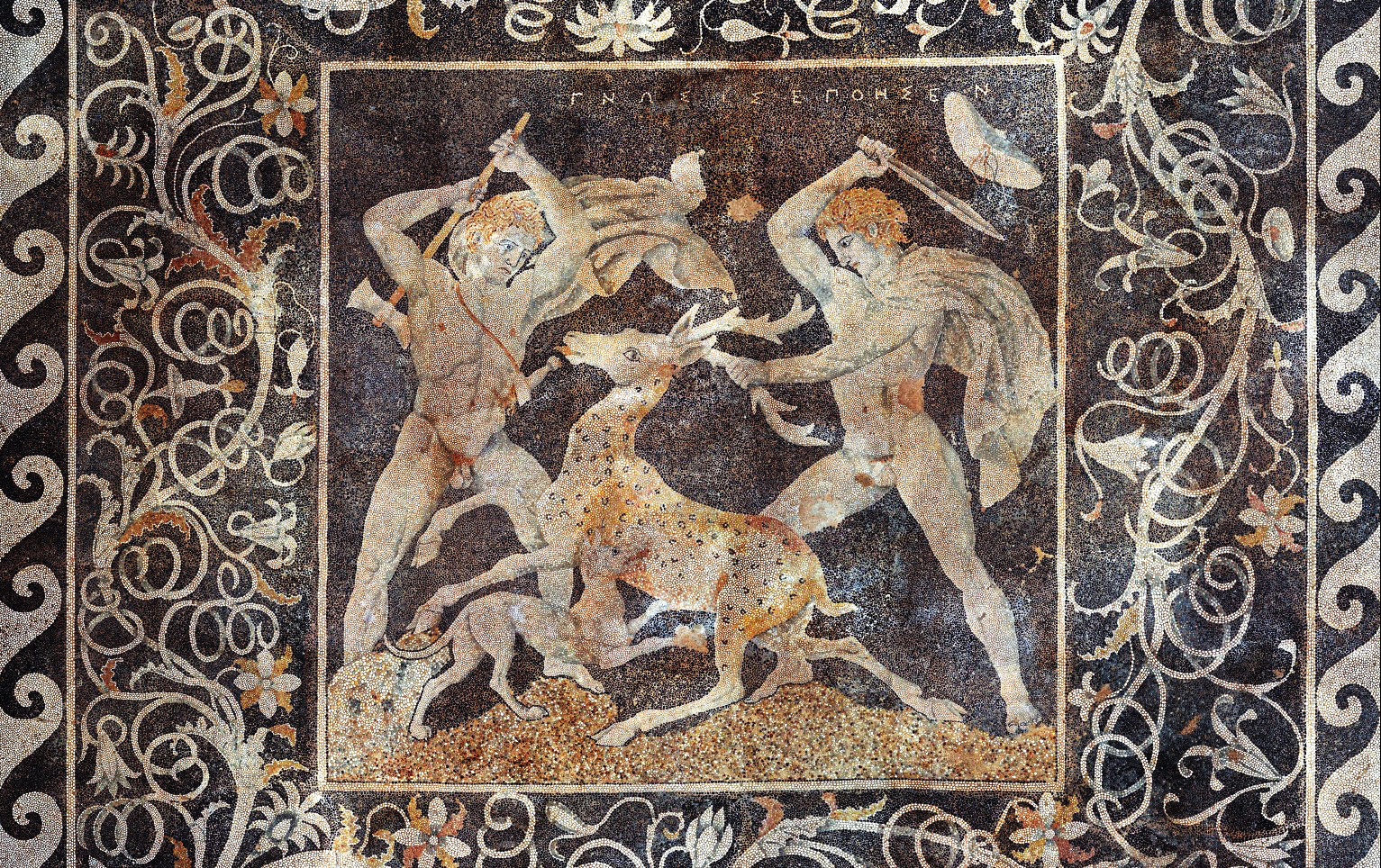
The Stag Hunt Mosaic, c. 300 BC, from Pella; the figure on the right is possibly Alexander the Great due to the date of the mosaic along with the depicted upsweep of his centrally-parted hair (anastole); the figure on the left wielding a double-edged axe (associated with Hephaistos) is perhaps Hephaestion, one of Alexander's loyal companions.

Alexander perhaps undercut his own rule by demonstrating signs of megalomania. While utilizing effective propaganda such as the cutting of the Gordian Knot, he also attempted to portray himself as a living god and son of Zeus following his visit to the oracle at Siwah in the Libyan Desert (in modern-day Egypt) in 331 BC. His attempt in 327 BC to have his men prostrate before him in Bactra in an act of proskynesis borrowed from the Persian kings was rejected as religious blasphemy by his Macedonian and Greek subjects after his court historian Callisthenes refused to perform this ritual. When Alexander had Parmenion murdered at Ecbatana (near modern Hamadan, Iran) in 330 BC, this was "symptomatic of the growing gulf between the king's interests and those of his country and people", according to Errington. His murder of Cleitus the Black in 328 BC is described as "vengeful and reckless" by Dawn L. Gilley and Ian Worthington. Continuing the polygamous habits of his father, Alexander encouraged his men to marry native women in Asia, leading by example when he wed Roxana, a Sogdian princess of Bactria. He then married Stateira II, eldest daughter of Darius III, and Parysatis II, youngest daughter of Artaxerxes III, at the Susa weddings in 324 BC.

Meanwhile, in Greece, the Spartan king Agis III attempted to lead a rebellion of the Greeks against Macedonia. He was defeated in 331 BC at the Battle of Megalopolis by Antipater, who was serving as regent of Macedonia and deputy hegemon of the League of Corinth in Alexander's stead. (Note: Gilley & Worthington 2010, pp. 199–200; Errington 1990, pp. 44, 93. Gilley and Worthington discuss the ambiguity surrounding the exact title of Antipater aside from deputy hegemon of the League of Corinth, with some sources calling him a regent, others a governor, others a simple general. N. G. L. Hammond and F. W. Walbank state that Alexander the Great left "Macedonia under the command of Antipater, in case there was a rising in Greece." Hammond & Walbank 2001, p. 32.) Before Antipater embarked on his campaign in the Peloponnese, Memnon, the governor of Thrace, was dissuaded from rebellion by use of diplomacy. Antipater deferred the punishment of Sparta to the League of Corinth headed by Alexander, who ultimately pardoned the Spartans on the condition that they submit fifty nobles as hostages. Antipater's hegemony was somewhat unpopular in Greece due to his practice (perhaps by order of Alexander) of exiling malcontents and garrisoning cities with Macedonian troops, yet in 330 BC, Alexander declared that the tyrannies installed in Greece were to be abolished and Greek freedom was to be restored.

=== Diadochi ===
Kingdoms of the Diadochi c. 301 BC, after the Battle of Ipsus Kingdom of Ptolemy I Soter Kingdom of Cassander Kingdom of Lysimachus Kingdom of Seleucus I Nicator Epirus Other Carthage Roman Republic Greek States

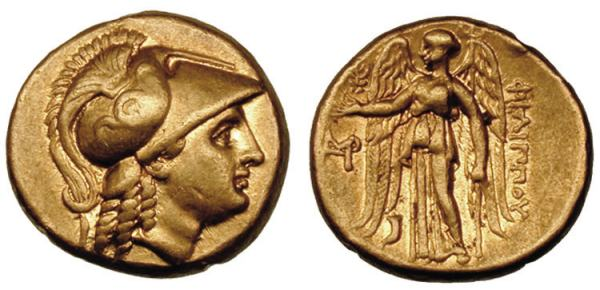
A golden stater of Philip III Arrhidaeus (r. 323–317 BC) bearing images of Athena (left) and Nike (right)

When Alexander the Great died at Babylon in 323 BC, his mother Olympias immediately accused Antipater and his faction of poisoning him, although there is no evidence to confirm this. With no official heir apparent, the Macedonian military command split, with one side proclaiming Alexander's half-brother Philip III Arrhidaeus (r. 323–317 BC) as king and the other siding with the infant son of Alexander and Roxana, Alexander IV (r. 323–309 BC). Except for the Euboeans and Boeotians, the Greeks also immediately rose up in a rebellion against Antipater known as the Lamian War (323–322 BC). When Antipater was defeated at the 323 BC Battle of Thermopylae, he fled to Lamia where he was besieged by the Athenian commander Leosthenes. A Macedonian army led by Leonnatus rescued Antipater by lifting the siege. Antipater defeated the rebellion, yet his death in 319 BC left a power vacuum wherein the two proclaimed kings of Macedonia became pawns in a power struggle between the diadochi, the former generals of Alexander's army.

A council of the army convened in Babylon immediately after Alexander's death, naming Philip III as king and the chiliarch Perdiccas as his regent. Antipater, Antigonus Monophthalmus, Craterus, and Ptolemy formed a coalition against Perdiccas in a civil war initiated by Ptolemy's seizure of the hearse of Alexander the Great. Perdiccas was assassinated in 321 BC by his own officers during a failed campaign in Egypt against Ptolemy, where his march along the Nile River resulted in the drowning of 2,000 of his men. Although Eumenes of Cardia managed to kill Craterus in battle, this had little to no effect on the outcome of the 321 BC Partition of Triparadisus in Syria where the victorious coalition settled the issue of a new regency and territorial rights. Antipater was appointed as regent over the two kings. Before Antipater died in 319 BC, he named the staunch Argead loyalist Polyperchon as his successor, passing over his own son Cassander and ignoring the right of the king to choose a new regent (since Philip III was considered mentally unstable), in effect bypassing the council of the army as well.

Forming an alliance with Ptolemy, Antigonus, and Lysimachus, Cassander had his officer Nicanor capture the Munichia fortress of Athens' port town Piraeus in defiance of Polyperchon's decree that Greek cities should be free of Macedonian garrisons, sparking the Second War of the Diadochi (319–315 BC). Given a string of military failures by Polyperchon, in 317 BC, Philip III, by way of his politically engaged wife Eurydice II of Macedon, officially replaced him as regent with Cassander. Afterwards, Polyperchon desperately sought the aid of Olympias in Epirus. A joint force of Epirotes, Aetolians, and Polyperchon's troops invaded Macedonia and forced the surrender of Philip III and Eurydice's army, allowing Olympias to execute the king and force his queen to commit suicide. Olympias then had Nicanor and dozens of other Macedonian nobles killed, but by the spring of 316 BC, Cassander had defeated her forces, captured her, and placed her on trial for murder before sentencing her to death.

Cassander married Philip II's daughter Thessalonike and briefly extended Macedonian control into Illyria as far as Epidamnos (modern Durrës, Albania). By 313 BC, it was retaken by the Illyrian king Glaucias of Taulantii. By 316 BC, Antigonus had taken the territory of Eumenes and managed to eject Seleucus Nicator from his Babylonian satrapy, leading Cassander, Ptolemy, and Lysimachus to issue a joint ultimatum to Antigonus in 315 BC for him to surrender various territories in Asia. Antigonus promptly allied with Polyperchon, now based in Corinth, and issued an ultimatum of his own to Cassander, charging him with murder for executing Olympias and demanding that he hand over the royal family, King Alexander IV and the queen mother Roxana. The conflict that followed lasted until the winter of 312/311 BC, when a new peace settlement recognized Cassander as general of Europe, Antigonus as "first in Asia", Ptolemy as general of Egypt, and Lysimachus as general of Thrace. Cassander had Alexander IV and Roxana put to death in the winter of 311/310 BC, and between 306 and 305 BC the diadochi were declared kings of their respective territories.

=== Hellenistic era ===
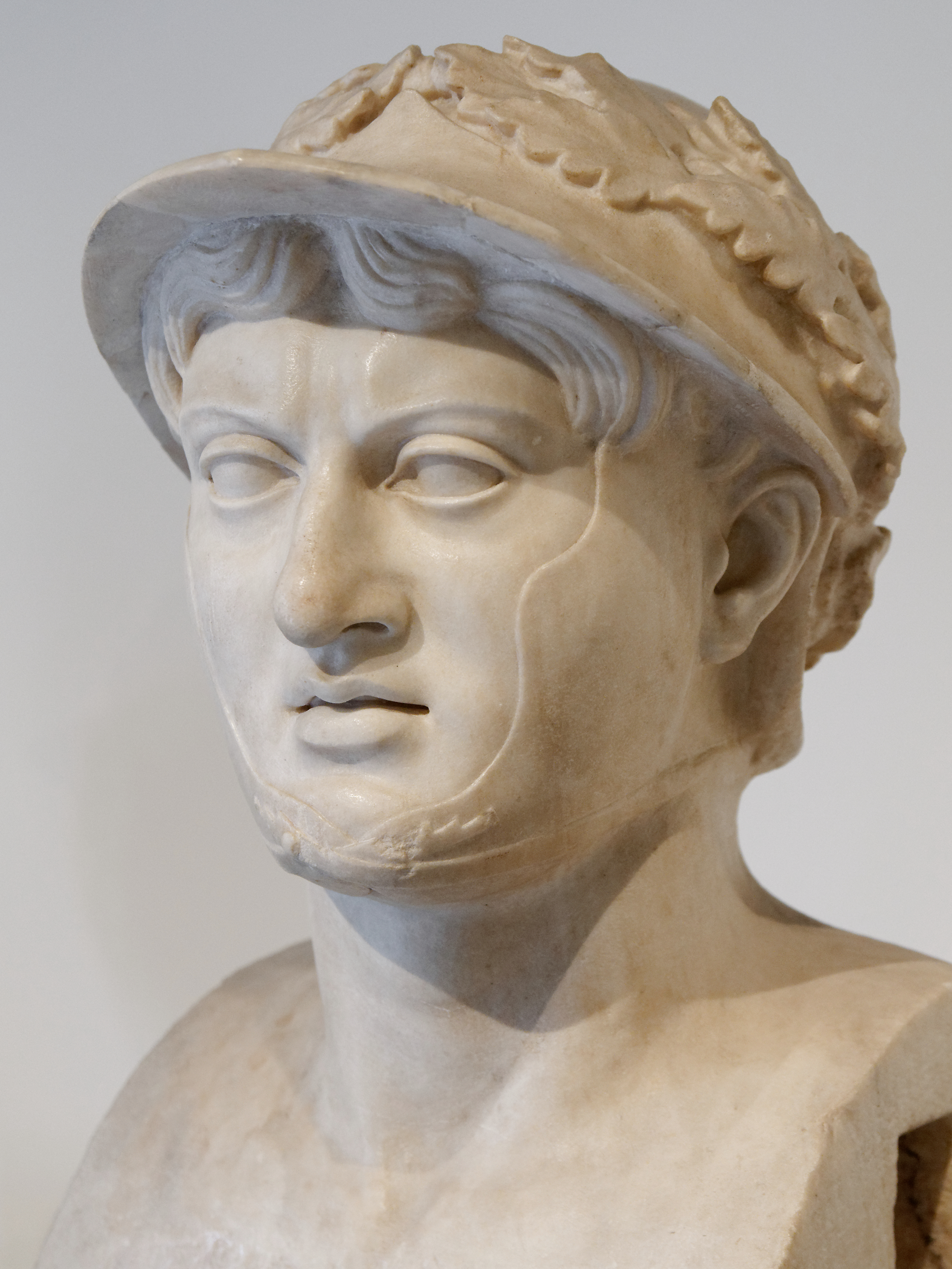
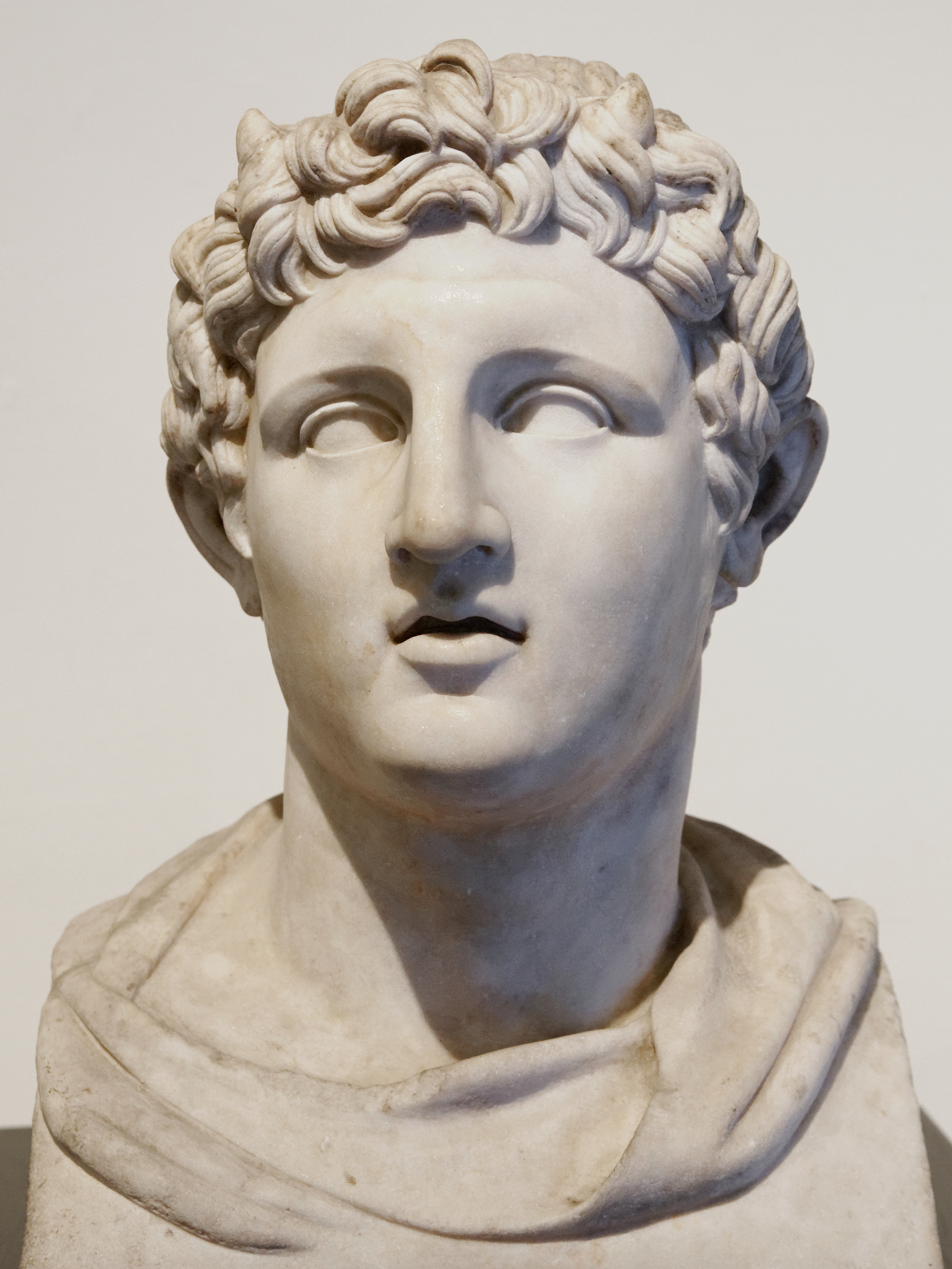
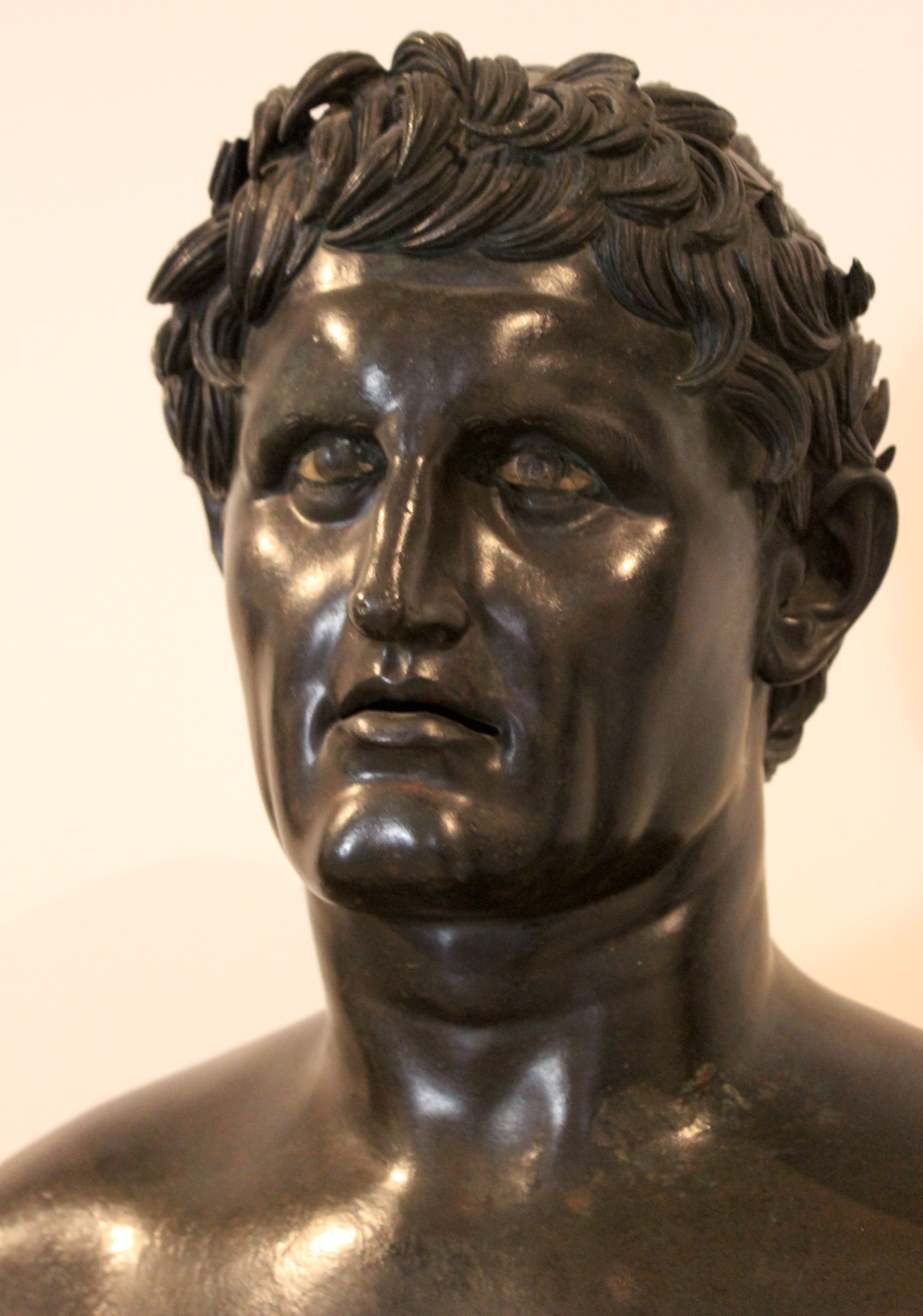
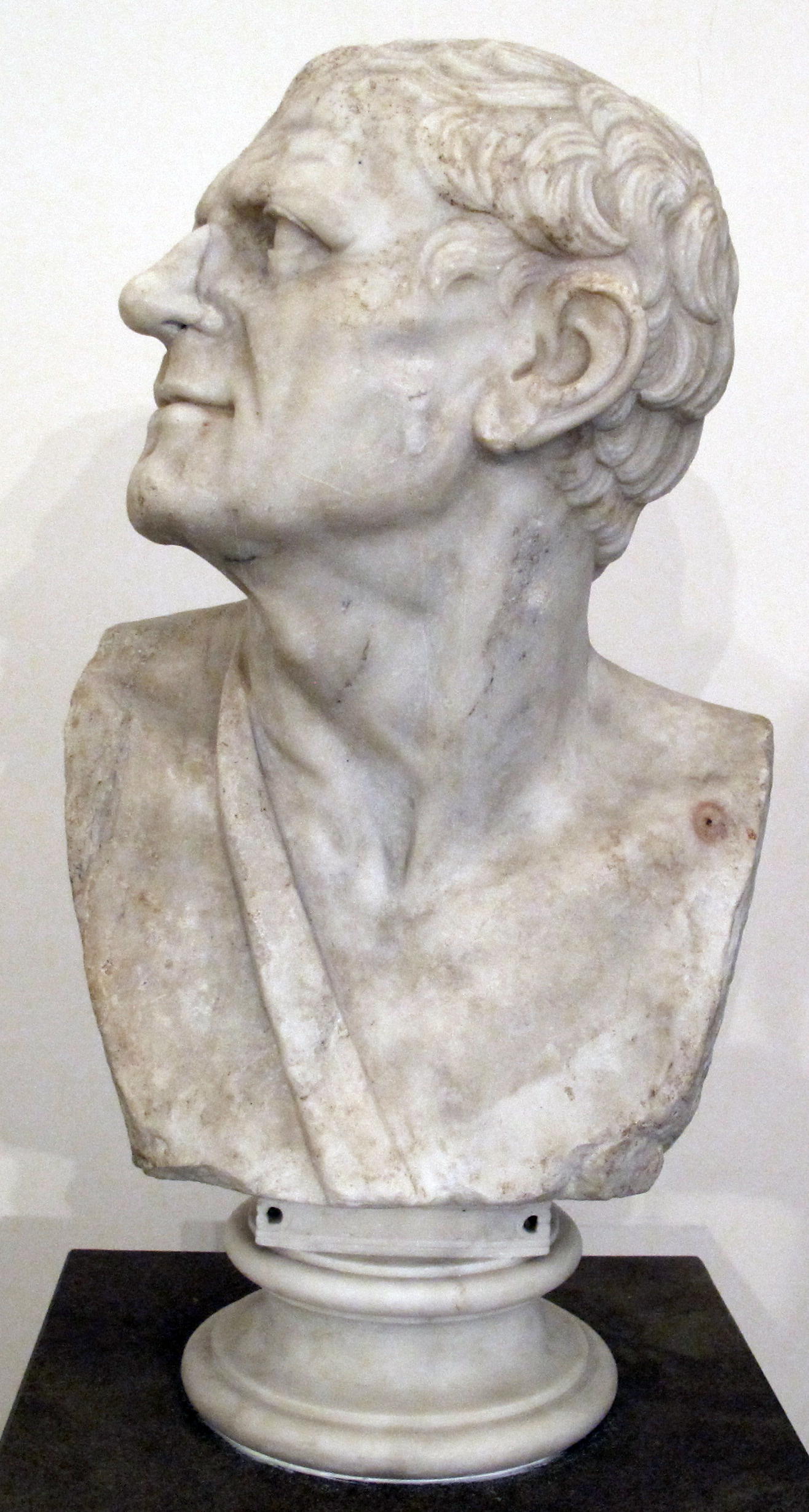
The portrait busts of Pyrrhus of Epirus (top left), Demetrius I of Macedon (top right), Seleucus I Nicator (bottom left), and Lysimachus (bottom right), Roman-era copies of Hellenistic Greek originals from the Villa of the Papyri at Herculaneum, Naples National Archaeological Museum

Hellenistic Greece was at first defined by the struggle between the Antipatrid dynasty, led first by Cassander (r. 305–297 BC), son of Antipater, and the Antigonid dynasty, led by the Macedonian general Antigonus I Monophthalmus (r. 306–301 BC) and his son, the future king Demetrius I (r. 294–288 BC). Cassander besieged Athens in 303 BC, but was forced to retreat to Macedonia when Demetrius invaded Boeotia to his rear, attempting to sever his path of retreat. While Antigonus and Demetrius attempted to recreate Philip II's Hellenic league with themselves as dual hegemons, a revived coalition of Cassander, Ptolemy I Soter (r. 305–283 BC) of Egypt's Ptolemaic dynasty, Seleucus I Nicator (r. 305–281 BC) of the Seleucid Empire, and Lysimachus (r. 306–281 BC), King of Thrace, defeated the Antigonids at the Battle of Ipsus in 301 BC, killing Antigonus and forcing Demetrius into flight.

Cassander died in 297 BC, and his sickly son Philip IV died the same year, succeeded by Cassander's other sons Alexander V of Macedon (r. 297–294 BC) and Antipater II of Macedon (r. 297–294 BC), with their mother Thessalonike of Macedon acting as regent. While Demetrius fought against the Antipatrid forces in Greece, Antipater II killed his own mother to obtain power. His desperate brother Alexander V then requested aid from Pyrrhus of Epirus (r. 297–272 BC), who had fought alongside Demetrius at the Battle of Ipsus, but was sent to Egypt as a hostage as part of an agreement between Demetrius and Ptolemy I. In exchange for defeating the forces of Antipater II and forcing him to flee to the court of Lysimachus in Thrace, Pyrrhus was awarded the westernmost portions of the Macedonian kingdom. Demetrius had his nephew Alexander V assassinated and was then proclaimed king of Macedonia, but his subjects protested against his aloof, Eastern-style autocracy.

War broke out between Pyrrhus and Demetrius in 290 BC when Lanassa, wife of Pyrrhus, daughter of Agathocles of Syracuse, left him for Demetrius and offered him her dowry of Corcyra. The war dragged on until 288 BC, when Demetrius lost the support of the Macedonians and fled the country. Macedonia was then divided between Pyrrhus and Lysimachus, the former taking western Macedonia and the latter eastern Macedonia. By 286 BC, Lysimachus had expelled Pyrrhus and his forces from Macedonia. (Note: Adams 2010, p. 219; Bringmann 2007, p. 61; Errington 1990, p. 155. Conversely, Errington dates Lysimachus' reunification of Macedonia by expelling Pyrrhus of Epirus as occurring in 284 BC, not 286 BC.) In 282 BC, a new war erupted between Seleucus I and Lysimachus; the latter was killed in the Battle of Corupedion, allowing Seleucus I to take control of Thrace and Macedonia. In two dramatic reversals of fortune, Seleucus I was assassinated in 281 BC by his officer Ptolemy Keraunos, son of Ptolemy I and grandson of Antipater, who was then proclaimed king of Macedonia before being killed in battle in 279 BC by Celtic invaders in the Gallic invasion of Greece. The Macedonian army proclaimed the general Sosthenes of Macedon as king, although he apparently refused the title. After defeating the Gallic ruler Bolgios and driving out the raiding party of Brennus, Sosthenes died and left a chaotic situation in Macedonia. The Gallic invaders ravaged Macedonia until Antigonus Gonatas, son of Demetrius, defeated them in Thrace at the 277 BC Battle of Lysimachia and was then proclaimed king Antigonus II of Macedon (r. 277–274, 272–239 BC).

In 280 BC, Pyrrhus embarked on a campaign in Magna Graecia (i.e. southern Italy) against the Roman Republic known as the Pyrrhic War, followed by his invasion of Sicily. Ptolemy Keraunos secured his position on the Macedonian throne by giving Pyrrhus five thousand soldiers and twenty war elephants for this endeavour. Pyrrhus returned to Epirus in 275 BC after the ultimate failure of both campaigns, which contributed to the rise of Rome because Greek cities in southern Italy such as Tarentum now became Roman allies. Pyrrhus invaded Macedonia in 274 BC, defeating the largely mercenary army of Antigonus II at the 274 BC Battle of Aous and driving him out of Macedonia, forcing him to seek refuge with his naval fleet in the Aegean.

==== Antigonid Macedon ====
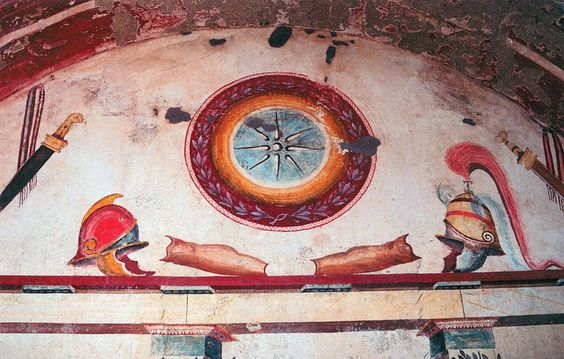
Paintings of Hellenistic-era military arms and armour from a tomb in ancient Mieza (modern-day Lefkadia), Imathia, Central Macedonia, Greece, 2nd century BC

Pyrrhus lost much of his support among the Macedonians in 273 BC when his unruly Gallic mercenaries plundered the royal cemetery of Aigai. Pyrrhus pursued Antigonus II in the Peloponnese, yet Antigonus II was ultimately able to recapture Macedonia. Pyrrhus was killed while besieging Argos in 272 BC, allowing Antigonus II to reclaim the rest of Greece. He then restored the Argead dynastic graves at Aigai and annexed the Kingdom of Paeonia.

The Aetolian League hampered Antigonus II's control over central Greece, and the formation of the Achaean League in 251 BC pushed Macedonian forces out of much of the Peloponnese and at times incorporated Athens and Sparta. While the Seleucid Empire aligned with Antigonid Macedonia against Ptolemaic Egypt during the Syrian Wars, the Ptolemaic navy heavily disrupted Antigonus II's efforts to control mainland Greece. With the aid of the Ptolemaic navy, the Athenian statesman Chremonides led a revolt against Macedonian authority known as the Chremonidean War (267–261 BC). By 265 BC, Athens was surrounded and besieged by Antigonus II's forces, and a Ptolemaic fleet was defeated in the Battle of Cos. Athens finally surrendered in 261 BC. After Macedonia formed an alliance with the Seleucid ruler Antiochus II, a peace settlement between Antigonus II and Ptolemy II Philadelphus of Egypt was finally struck in 255 BC.

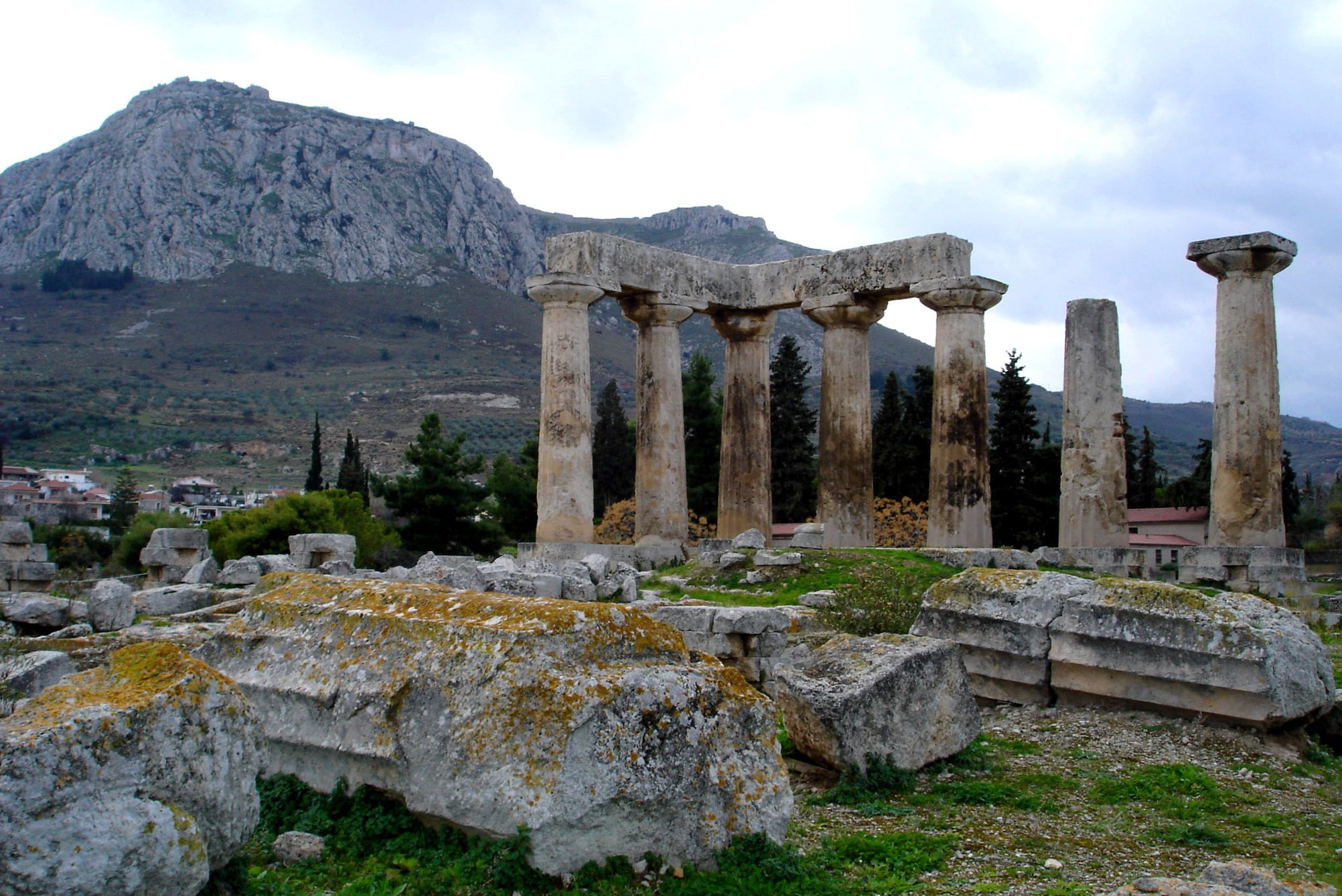
The Temple of Apollo at Corinth, built c. 540 BC, with the Acrocorinth (i.e. the acropolis of Corinth that once held a Macedonian garrison) seen in the background

In 251 BC, Aratus of Sicyon led a rebellion against Antigonus II, and in 250 BC, Ptolemy II declared his support for the self-proclaimed King Alexander of Corinth. Although Alexander died in 246 BC and Antigonus was able to score a naval victory against the Ptolemies at Andros, the Macedonians lost the Acrocorinth to the forces of Aratus in 243 BC, followed by the induction of Corinth into the Achaean League. Antigonus II made peace with the Achaean League in 240 BC, ceding the territories that he had lost in Greece. Antigonus II died in 239 BC and was succeeded by his son Demetrius II of Macedon (r. 239–229 BC). Seeking an alliance with Macedonia to defend against the Aetolians, the queen mother and regent of Epirus, Olympias II, offered her daughter Phthia of Macedon to Demetrius II in marriage. Demetrius II accepted her proposal, but he damaged relations with the Seleucids by divorcing Stratonice of Macedon. Although the Aetolians formed an alliance with the Achaean League as a result, Demetrius II was able to invade Boeotia and capture it from the Aetolians by 236 BC.

The Achaean League managed to capture Megalopolis in 235 BC, and by the end of Demetrius II's reign most of the Peloponnese except Argos was taken from the Macedonians. Demetrius II also lost an ally in Epirus when the monarchy was toppled in a republican revolution. Demetrius II enlisted the aid of the Illyrian king Agron to defend Acarnania against Aetolia, and in 229 BC, they managed to defeat the combined navies of the Aetolian and Achaean Leagues at the Battle of Paxos. Another Illyrian ruler, Longarus of the Dardanian Kingdom, invaded Macedonia and defeated an army of Demetrius II shortly before his death in 229 BC. Although his young son Philip immediately inherited the throne, his regent Antigonus III Doson (r. 229–221 BC), nephew of Antigonus II, was proclaimed king by the army, with Philip as his heir, following a string of military victories against the Illyrians in the north and the Aetolians in Thessaly.

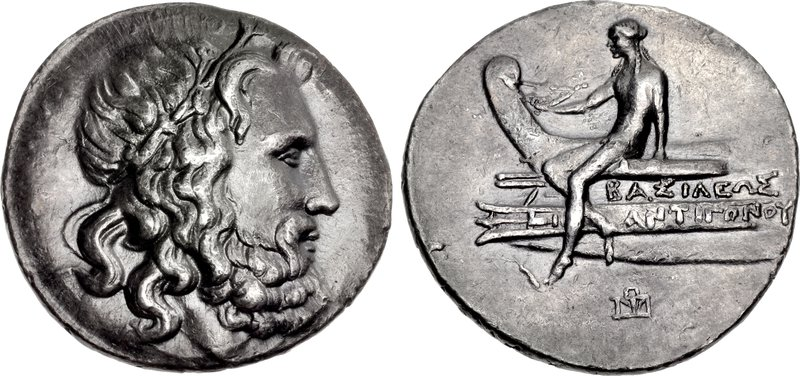
A tetradrachm minted during the reign of Antigonus III Doson (r. 229–221 BC), possibly at Amphipolis, bearing the portrait image of Poseidon on the obverse and on the reverse a scene depicting Apollo sitting on the prow of a ship

Aratus sent an embassy to Antigonus III in 226 BC seeking an unexpected alliance now that the reformist king Cleomenes III of Sparta was threatening the rest of Greece in the Cleomenean War (229–222 BC). In exchange for military aid, Antigonus III demanded the return of Corinth to Macedonian control, which Aratus finally agreed to in 225 BC. In 224 BC, Antigonus III's forces took Arcadia from Sparta. After forming a Hellenic league in the same vein as Philip II's League of Corinth, he managed to defeat Sparta at the Battle of Sellasia in 222 BC. Sparta was occupied by a foreign power for the first time in its history, restoring Macedonia's position as the leading power in Greece. Antigonus died a year later, perhaps from tuberculosis, leaving behind a strong Hellenistic kingdom for his successor Philip V.

Philip V of Macedon (r. 221–179 BC) faced immediate challenges to his authority by the Illyrian Dardani and Aetolian League. Philip V and his allies were successful against the Aetolians and their allies in the Social War (220–217 BC), yet he made peace with the Aetolians once he heard of incursions by the Dardani in the north and the Carthaginian victory over the Romans at the Battle of Lake Trasimene in 217 BC. Demetrius of Pharos is alleged to have convinced Philip V to first secure Illyria in advance of an invasion of the Italian peninsula. (Note: Eckstein 2010, pp. 229–230; see also Errington 1990, pp. 186–189 for further details. Errington is skeptical that Philip V at this point had any intentions of invading southern Italy via Illyria once the latter was secured, deeming his plans to be "more modest", Errington 1990, p. 189.) In 216 BC, Philip V sent a hundred light warships into the Adriatic Sea to attack Illyria, a move that prompted Scerdilaidas of the Ardiaean Kingdom to appeal to the Romans for aid. Rome responded by sending ten heavy quinqueremes from Roman Sicily to patrol the Illyrian coasts, causing Philip V to reverse course and order his fleet to retreat, averting open conflict for the time being.

=== Conflict with Rome ===
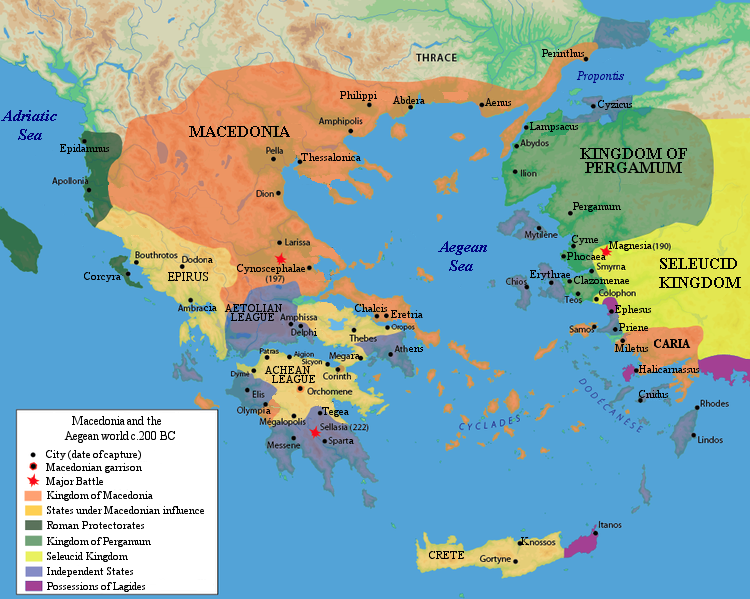
The Kingdom of Macedonia (orange) under Philip V (r. 221–179 BC), with Macedonian dependent states (dark yellow), the Seleucid Empire (bright yellow), Roman protectorates (dark green), the Kingdom of Pergamon (light green), independent states (light purple), and possessions of the Ptolemaic Empire (violet purple)

In 215 BC, at the height of the Second Punic War with the Carthaginian Empire, Roman authorities intercepted a ship off the Calabrian coast holding a Macedonian envoy and a Carthaginian ambassador in possession of a treaty composed by Hannibal declaring an alliance with Philip V. The treaty stipulated that Carthage had the sole right to negotiate the terms of Rome's hypothetical surrender and promised mutual aid if a resurgent Rome should seek revenge against either Macedonia or Carthage. Although the Macedonians were perhaps only interested in safeguarding their newly conquered territories in Illyria, the Romans were nevertheless able to thwart whatever grand ambitions Philip V had for the Adriatic region during the First Macedonian War (214–205 BC). In 214 BC, Rome positioned a naval fleet at Oricus, which was assaulted along with Apollonia by Macedonian forces. When the Macedonians captured Lissus in 212 BC, the Roman Senate responded by inciting the Aetolian League, Sparta, Elis, Messenia, and Attalus I (r. 241–197 BC) of Pergamon to wage war against Philip V, keeping him occupied and away from Italy.

The Aetolian League concluded a peace agreement with Philip V in 206 BC, and the Roman Republic negotiated the Treaty of Phoenice in 205 BC, ending the war and allowing the Macedonians to retain some captured settlements in Illyria. Although the Romans rejected an Aetolian request in 202 BC for Rome to declare war on Macedonia once again, the Roman Senate gave serious consideration to the similar offer made by Pergamon and its ally Rhodes in 201 BC. These states were concerned about Philip V's alliance with Antiochus III the Great of the Seleucid Empire, which invaded the war-weary and financially exhausted Ptolemaic Empire in the Fifth Syrian War (202–195 BC) as Philip V captured Ptolemaic settlements in the Aegean Sea. Although Rome's envoys played a critical role in convincing Athens to join the anti-Macedonian alliance with Pergamon and Rhodes in 200 BC, the comitia centuriata (people's assembly) rejected the Roman Senate's proposal for a declaration of war on Macedonia. Meanwhile, Philip V conquered territories in the Hellespont and Bosporus as well as Ptolemaic Samos, which led Rhodes to form an alliance with Pergamon, Byzantium, Cyzicus, and Chios against Macedonia. Despite Philip V's nominal alliance with the Seleucid king, he lost the naval Battle of Chios in 201 BC and was blockaded at Bargylia by the Rhodian and Pergamene navies.

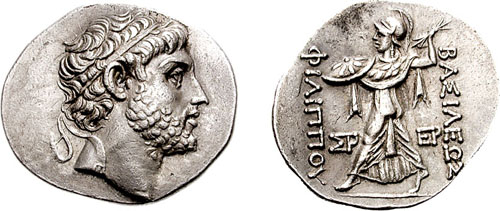
A tetradrachm of Philip V of Macedon (r. 221–179 BC), with the king's portrait on the obverse and Athena Alkidemos brandishing a thunderbolt on the reverse

While Philip V was busy fighting Rome's Greek allies, Rome viewed this as an opportunity to punish this former ally of Hannibal with a war that they hoped would supply a victory and require few resources. (Note: Bringmann 2007, pp. 86–87. Errington 1990, pp. 202–203: "Roman desire for revenge and private hopes of famous victories were probably the decisive reasons for the outbreak of the war.") The Roman Senate demanded that Philip V cease hostilities against neighbouring Greek powers and defer to an international arbitration committee for settling grievances. When the comitia centuriata finally voted in approval of the Roman Senate's declaration of war in 200 BC and handed their ultimatum to Philip V, demanding that a tribunal assess the damages owed to Rhodes and Pergamon, the Macedonian king rejected it. This marked the beginning of the Second Macedonian War (200–197 BC), with Publius Sulpicius Galba Maximus spearheading military operations in Apollonia.

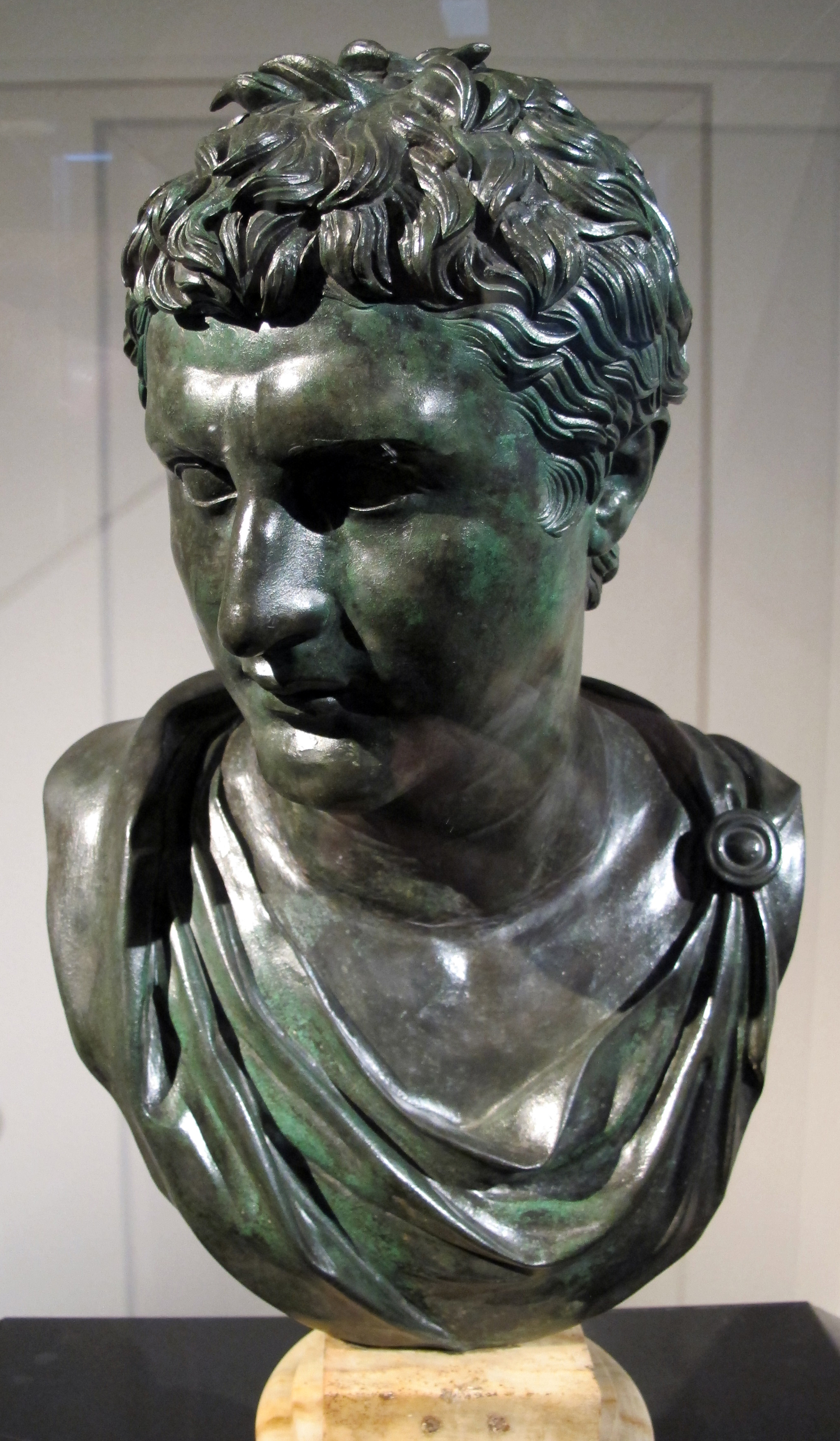
Bronze bust of Eumenes II of Pergamon, a Roman copy of a Hellenistic Greek original, from the Villa of the Papyri in Herculaneum

The Macedonians successfully defended their territory for roughly two years, but the Roman consul Titus Quinctius Flamininus managed to expel Philip V from Macedonia in 198 BC, forcing his men to take refuge in Thessaly. When the Achaean League switched their loyalties from Macedonia to Rome, the Macedonian king sued for peace, but the terms offered were considered too stringent, and so the war continued. In June 197 BC, the Macedonians were defeated at the Battle of Cynoscephalae. Rome then ratified a treaty that forced Macedonia to relinquish control of much of its Greek possessions outside of Macedonia proper, if only to act as a buffer against Illyrian and Thracian incursions into Greece. Although some Greeks suspected Roman intentions of supplanting Macedonia as the new hegemonic power in Greece, Flaminius announced at the Isthmian Games of 196 BC that Rome intended to preserve Greek liberty by leaving behind no garrisons and by not exacting tribute of any kind. His promise was delayed by negotiations with the Spartan king Nabis, who had meanwhile captured Argos, yet Roman forces evacuated Greece in 194 BC.

Encouraged by the Aetolian League and their calls to liberate Greece from the Romans, the Seleucid king Antiochus III landed with his army at Demetrias, Thessaly, in 192 BC, and was elected strategos by the Aetolians. Macedonia, the Achaean League, and other Greek city-states maintained their alliance with Rome. The Romans defeated the Seleucids in the 191 BC Battle of Thermopylae as well as the Battle of Magnesia in 190 BC, forcing the Seleucids to pay a war indemnity, dismantle most of its navy, and abandon its claims to any territories north or west of the Taurus Mountains in the 188 BC Treaty of Apamea. With Rome's acceptance, Philip V was able to capture some cities in central Greece in 191–189 BC that had been allied to Antiochus III, while Rhodes and Eumenes II (r. 197–159 BC) of Pergamon gained territories in Asia Minor.

Failing to please all sides in various territorial disputes, the Roman Senate decided in 184/183 BC to force Philip V to abandon Aenus and Maronea, since these had been declared free cities in the Treaty of Apamea. (Note: Bringmann 2007, pp. 93–97; Eckstein 2010, p. 239; Errington 1990, pp. 207–208. Bringmann dates this event of handing over Aenus and Maronea along the Thracian coast as 183 BC, while Eckstein dates it as 184 BC.) This assuaged the fear of Eumenes II that Macedonia could pose a threat to his lands in the Hellespont. Perseus of Macedon (r. 179–168 BC) succeeded Philip V and executed his brother Demetrius, who had been favoured by the Romans but was charged by Perseus with high treason. Perseus then attempted to form marriage alliances with Prusias II of Bithynia and Seleucus IV Philopator of the Seleucid Empire, along with renewed relations with Rhodes that greatly unsettled Eumenes II. Although Eumenes II attempted to undermine these diplomatic relationships, Perseus fostered an alliance with the Boeotian League, extended his authority into Illyria and Thrace, and in 174 BC, won the role of managing the Temple of Apollo at Delphi as a member of the Amphictyonic Council.

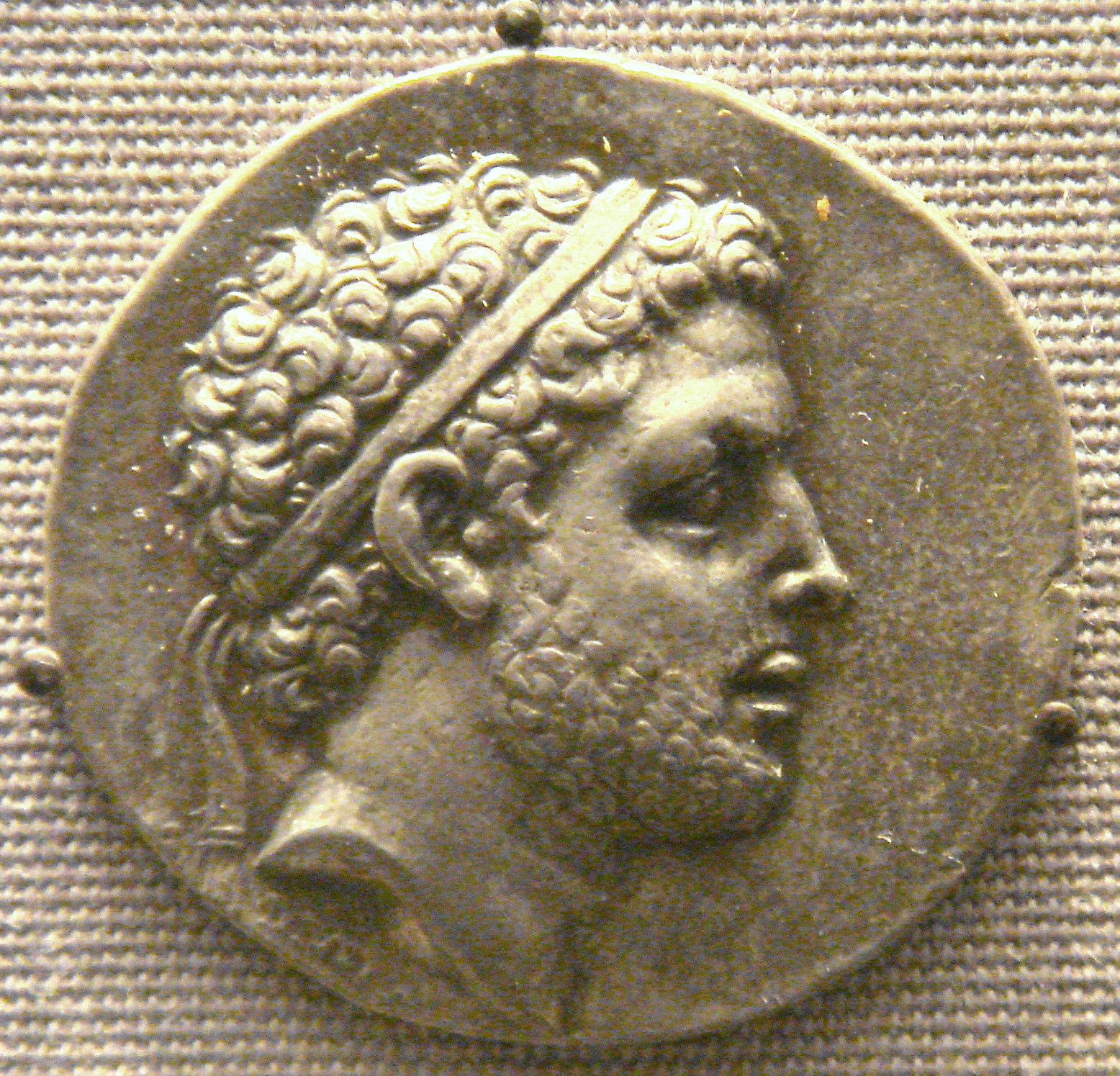
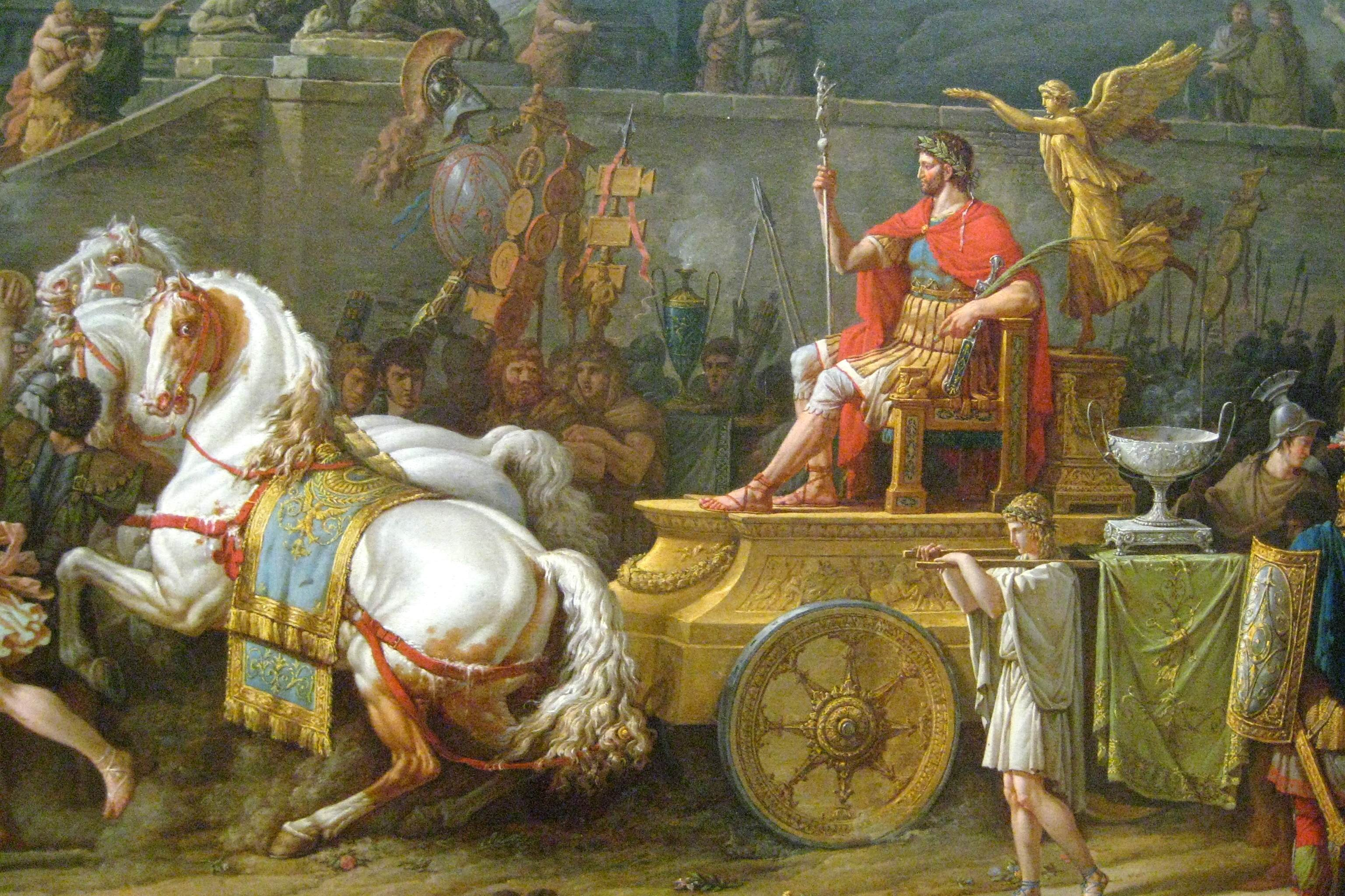
Left, a tetradrachm of Perseus of Macedon (r. 179–168 BC), British Museum. Right, The Triumph of Aemilius Paulus (detail) by Carle Vernet, 1789.

Eumenes II came to Rome in 172 BC and delivered a speech to the Senate denouncing the alleged crimes and transgressions of Perseus. This convinced the Roman Senate to declare the Third Macedonian War (171–168 BC). (Note: Bringmann 2007, pp. 98–99; see also Eckstein 2010, p. 242, who says that "Rome ... as the sole remaining superpower ... would not accept Macedonia as a peer competitor or equal." Klaus Bringmann asserts that negotiations with Macedonia were completely ignored due to Rome's "political calculation" that the Macedonian kingdom had to be destroyed to ensure the elimination of the "supposed source of all the difficulties which Rome was having in the Greek world".) Although Perseus's forces were victorious against the Romans at the Battle of Callinicus in 171 BC, the Macedonian army was defeated at the Battle of Pydna in June 168 BC. Perseus fled to Samothrace but surrendered shortly afterwards, was brought to Rome for the triumph of Lucius Aemilius Paullus Macedonicus, and was placed under house arrest at Alba Fucens, where he died in 166 BC. The Romans abolished the Macedonian monarchy by installing four separate allied republics in its stead, their capitals located at Amphipolis, Thessalonica, Pella, and Pelagonia. The Romans imposed severe laws inhibiting many social and economic interactions between the inhabitants of these republics, including the banning of marriages between them and the (temporary) prohibition on gold and silver mining. A certain Andriscus, claiming Antigonid descent, rebelled against the Romans and was pronounced king of Macedonia, defeating the army of the Roman praetor Publius Juventius Thalna during the Fourth Macedonian War (150–148 BC). Despite this, Andriscus was defeated in 148 BC at the second Battle of Pydna by Quintus Caecilius Metellus Macedonicus, whose forces occupied the kingdom. This was followed in 146 BC by the Roman destruction of Carthage and victory over the Achaean League at the Battle of Corinth, ushering in the era of Roman Greece and the gradual establishment of the Roman province of Macedonia.

== Institutions ==
=== Division of power ===
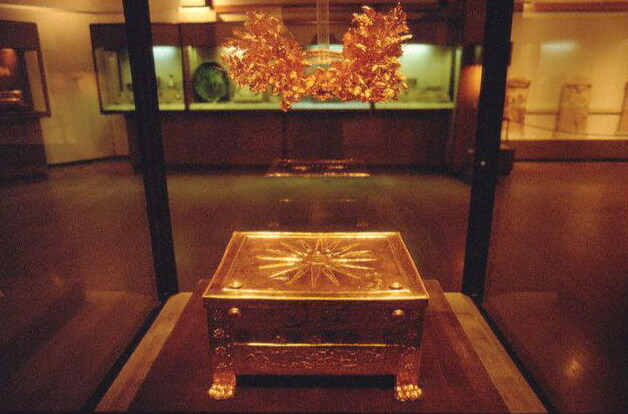
The Vergina Sun, the 16-ray star covering the royal burial larnax of Philip II of Macedon (r. 359–336 BC), discovered in the tomb of Vergina, formerly ancient Aigai

At the head of Macedonia's government was the king (basileus). (Note: Written evidence about Macedonian governmental institutions made before Philip II of Macedon's reign is both rare and non-Macedonian in origin. The main sources of early Macedonian historiography are the works of Herodotus, Thucydides, Diodorus Siculus, and Justin. Contemporary accounts given by those such as Demosthenes were often hostile and unreliable; even Aristotle, who lived in Macedonia, provides us with terse accounts of its governing institutions. Polybius was a contemporary historian who wrote about Macedonia; later historians include Livy, Quintus Curtius Rufus, Plutarch, and Arrian. The works of these historians affirm Macedonia's hereditary monarchy and basic institutions, yet it remains unclear if there was an established constitution for Macedonian government. See: King 2010, pp. 373–374. However, N. G. L. Hammond and F. W. Walbank write with apparent certainty and conviction when describing the Macedonian constitutional government restricting the king and involving a popular assembly of the army. See: Hammond & Walbank 2001, pp. 12–13. The main textual primary sources for the organization of Macedonia's military as it existed under Alexander the Great include Arrian, Curtis, Diodorus, and Plutarch; modern historians rely mostly on Polybius and Livy for understanding detailed aspects of the Antigonid-period military. On this, Sekunda 2010, pp. 446–447 writes: "... to this we can add the evidence provided by two magnificent archaeological monuments, the 'Alexander Sarcophagus' in particular and the 'Alexander Mosaic'... In the case of the Antigonid army ... valuable additional details are occasionally supplied by Diodorus and Plutarch, and by a series of inscriptions preserving sections of two sets of army regulations issued by Philip V.") From at least the reign of Philip II, the king was assisted by the royal pages (basilikoi paides), bodyguards (somatophylakes), companions (hetairoi), friends (philoi), an assembly that included members of the military, and (during the Hellenistic period) magistrates. Evidence is lacking regarding the extent to which each of these groups shared authority with the king or if their existence had a basis in a formal constitutional framework. (Note: King 2010, p. 374; for an argument about the absolutism of the Macedonian monarchy, see Errington 1990, pp. 220–222. However, N. G. L. Hammond and F. W. Walbank write with apparent certainty and conviction when describing the Macedonian constitutional government restricting the king and involving a popular assembly of the army. Hammond & Walbank 2001, pp. 12–13.) Before the reign of Philip II, the only institution supported by textual evidence is the monarchy. (Note: King 2010, p. 375. In 1931 Friedrich Granier was the first to propose that by the time of Philip II's reign, Macedonia had a constitutional government with laws that delegated rights and customary privileges to certain groups, especially to its citizen soldiers, although the majority of evidence for the army's alleged right to appoint a new king and judge cases of treason stems from the reign of Alexander III of Macedon. See Granier 1931, pp. 4–28, 48–57 and King 2010, pp. 374–375. Pietro De Francisci was the first to refute Granier's ideas and advance the theory that the Macedonian government was an autocracy ruled by the whim of the monarch, although this issue of kingship and governance is still unresolved in academia. See: de Francisci 1948, pp. 345–435 as well as King 2010, p. 375 and Errington 1990, p. 220 for further details.)

=== Kingship and the royal court ===
The earliest known government of ancient Macedonia was that of its monarchy, lasting until 167 BC when it was abolished by the Romans. The Macedonian hereditary monarchy existed since at least the time of Archaic Greece, with Homeric aristocratic roots in Mycenaean Greece. Thucydides wrote that in previous ages, Macedonia was divided into small tribal regions, each having its own petty king, the tribes of Lower Macedonia eventually coalescing under one great king who exercised power as an overlord over the lesser kings of Upper Macedonia. The direct line of father-to-son succession was broken after the assassination of Orestes of Macedon in 396 BC (allegedly by his regent and successor Aeropus II of Macedon), clouding the issue of whether primogeniture was the established custom or if there was a constitutional right for an assembly of the army or of the people to choose another king. It is unclear if the male offspring of Macedonian queens or consorts were always preferred over others given the accession of Archelaus I of Macedon, son of Perdiccas II of Macedon and a slave woman, although Archelaus succeeded the throne after murdering his father's designated heir apparent.

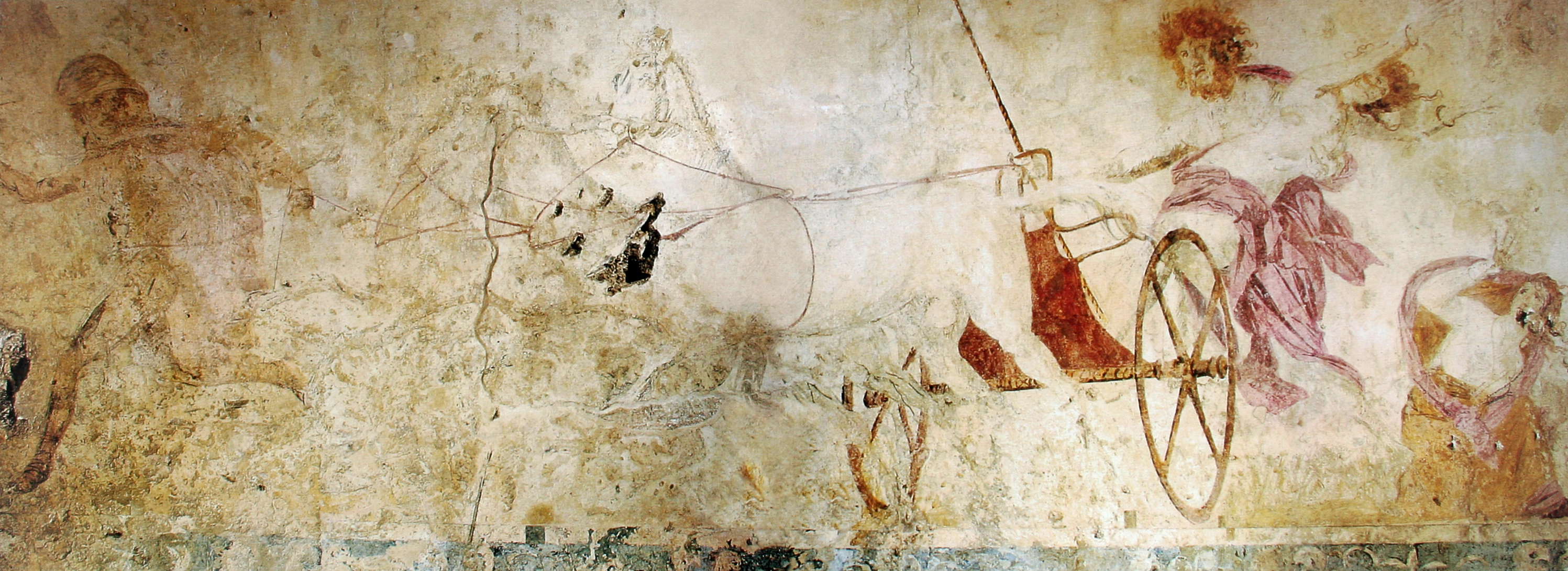
Hades abducting Persephone, fresco in the small Macedonian royal tomb at Vergina, Macedonia, Greece, c. 340 BC

It is known that Macedonian kings before Philip II upheld the privileges and carried out the responsibilities of hosting foreign diplomats, determining the kingdom's foreign policies, and negotiating alliances with foreign powers. After the Greek victory at Salamis in 480 BC, the Persian commander Mardonius had Alexander I of Macedon sent to Athens as a chief envoy to orchestrate an alliance between the Achaemenid Empire and Athens. The decision to send Alexander was based on his marriage alliance with a noble Persian house and his previous formal relationship with the city-state of Athens. With their ownership of natural resources including gold, silver, timber, and royal land, the early Macedonian kings were also capable of bribing foreign and domestic parties with impressive gifts.

Little is known about the judicial system of ancient Macedonia except that the king acted as the chief judge of the kingdom. The Macedonian kings were also supreme commanders of the military. (Note: King 2010, p. 379; Errington 1990, p. 221; early evidence for this includes not only Alexander I's role as a commander in the Greco-Persian Wars but also the city-state of Potidaea's acceptance of Perdiccas II of Macedon as their commander-in-chief during their rebellion against the Delian League of Athens in 432 BC.) Philip II was also highly regarded for his acts of piety in serving as the high priest of the nation. He performed daily ritual sacrifices and led religious festivals. Alexander imitated various aspects of his father's reign, such as granting land and gifts to loyal aristocratic followers, but lost some core support among them for adopting some of the trappings of an Eastern, Persian monarch, a "lord and master" as Carol J. King suggests, instead of a "comrade-in-arms" as was the traditional relationship of Macedonian kings with their companions. Alexander's father, Philip II, was perhaps influenced by Persian traditions when he adopted institutions similar to those found in the Achaemenid realm, such as having a royal secretary, royal archive, royal pages, and a seated throne.

=== Royal pages ===
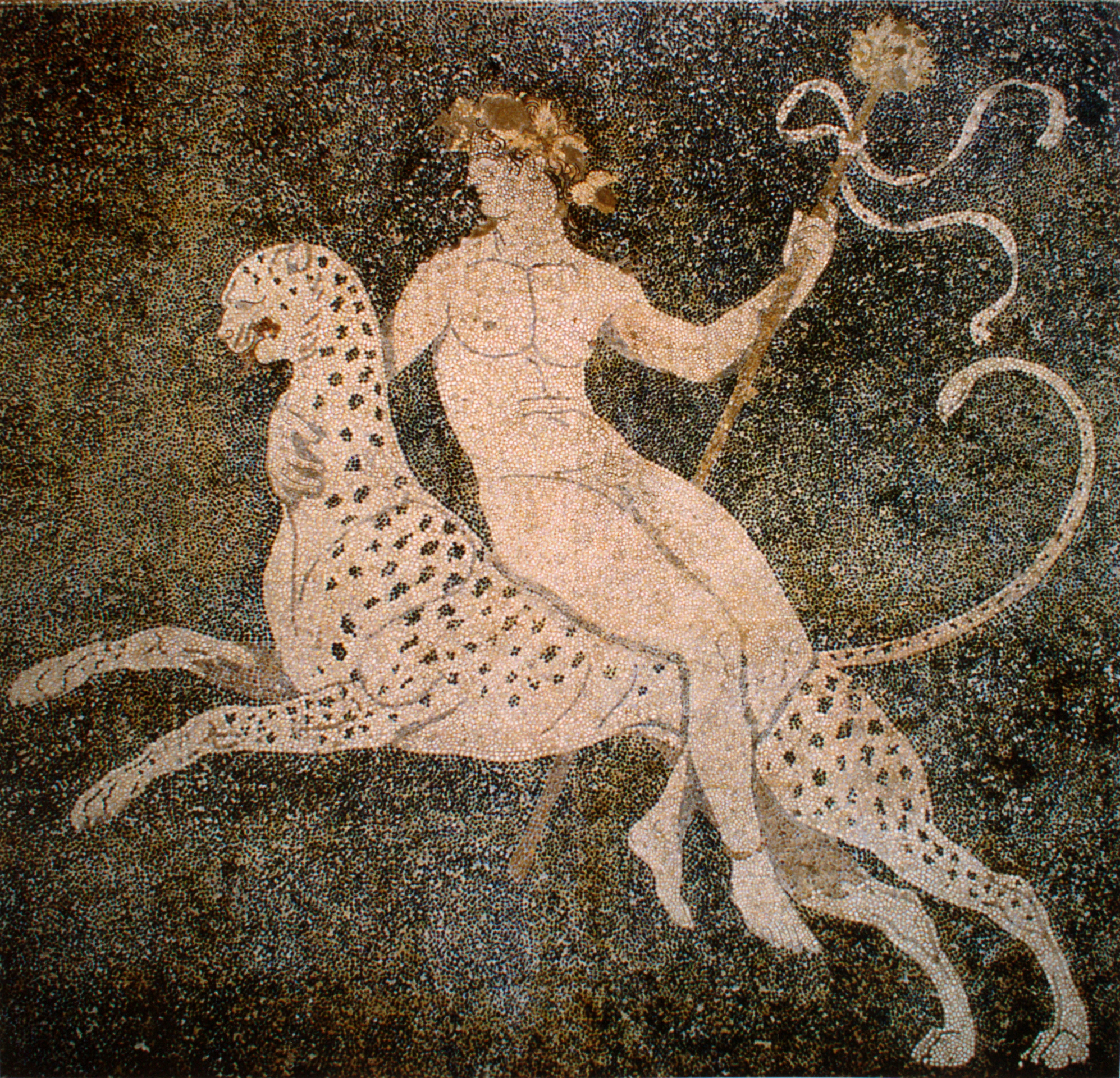
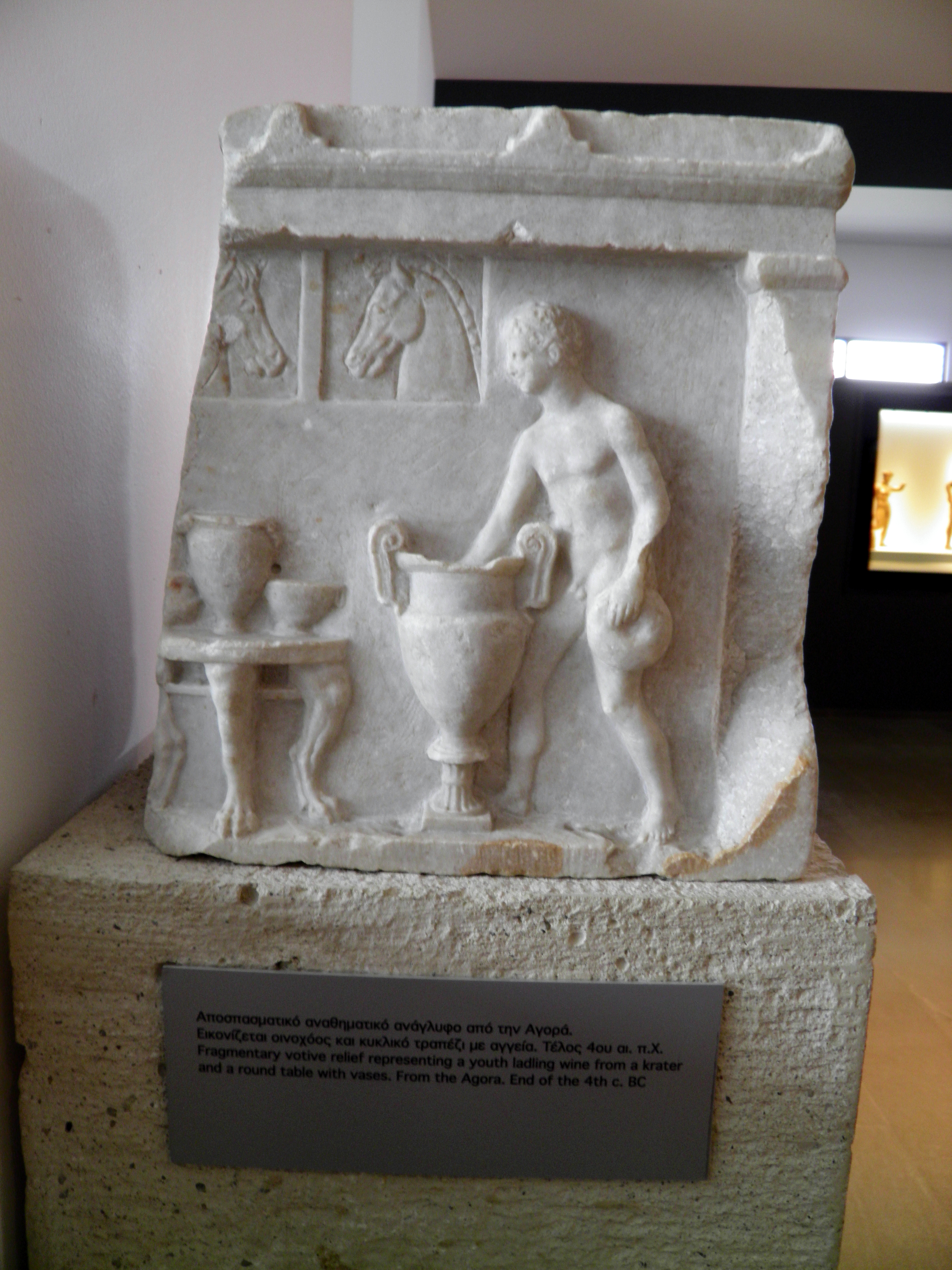
Left, the god Dionysos riding a cheetah, mosaic floor in the "House of Dionysos" at Pella, Greece, c. 330–300 BC. Right, a framentary votive relief depicting a youth ladling wine from a krater next to a round table with vases, from the agora of Pella, end of 4th century BC, Archaeological Museum of Pella.

The royal pages were adolescent boys and young men conscripted from aristocratic households and serving the kings of Macedonia perhaps from the reign of Philip II onward, although more solid evidence dates to the reign of Alexander the Great. (Note: Sawada 2010, pp. 403–405. According to Carol J. King, there was no "certain reference" to this institutional group until the military campaigns of Alexander the Great in Asia.King 2010, pp. 380–381. However, N. G. L. Hammond and F. W. Walbank state that the royal pages are attested to as far back as the reign of Archelaus I of Macedon. Hammond & Walbank 2001, p. 13.) Royal pages played no direct role in high politics and were conscripted as a means to introduce them to political life. After a period of training and service, pages were expected to become members of the king's companions and personal retinue. During their training, pages were expected to guard the king as he slept, supply him with horses, aid him in mounting his horse, accompany him on royal hunts, and serve him during symposia (i.e. formal drinking parties). Although there is little evidence for royal pages in the Antigonid period, it is known that some of them fled with Perseus of Macedon to Samothrace following his defeat by the Romans in 168 BC.

=== Bodyguards ===
Royal bodyguards served as the closest members to the king at court and on the battlefield. They were split into two categories: the agema of the hypaspistai, a type of ancient special forces usually numbering in the hundreds, and a smaller group of men handpicked by the king either for their individual merits or to honor the noble families to which they belonged. Therefore, the bodyguards, limited in number and forming the king's inner circle, were not always responsible for protecting the king's life on and off the battlefield; their title and office was more a mark of distinction, perhaps used to quell rivalries between aristocratic houses.

=== Companions, friends, councils, and assemblies ===
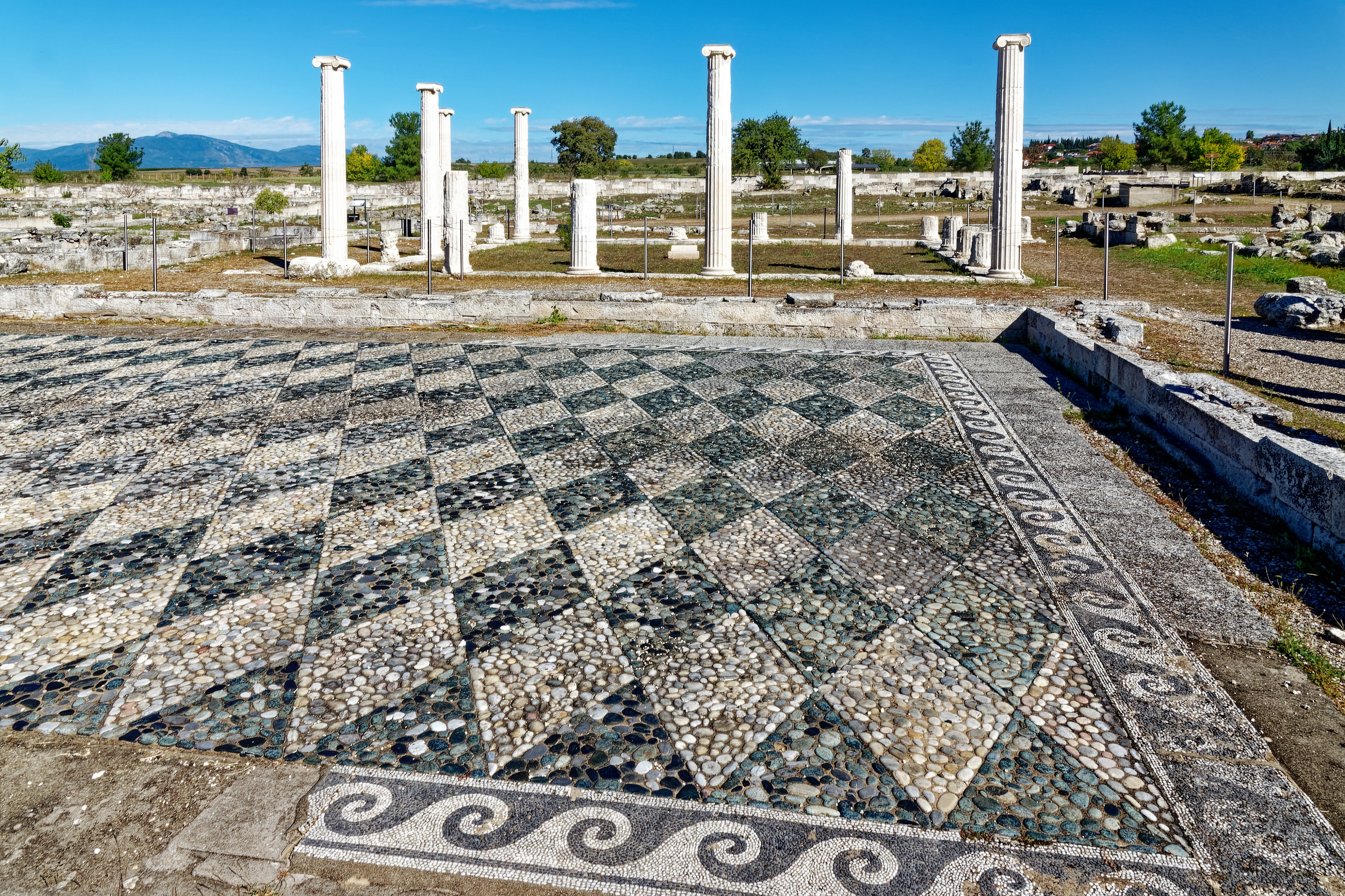
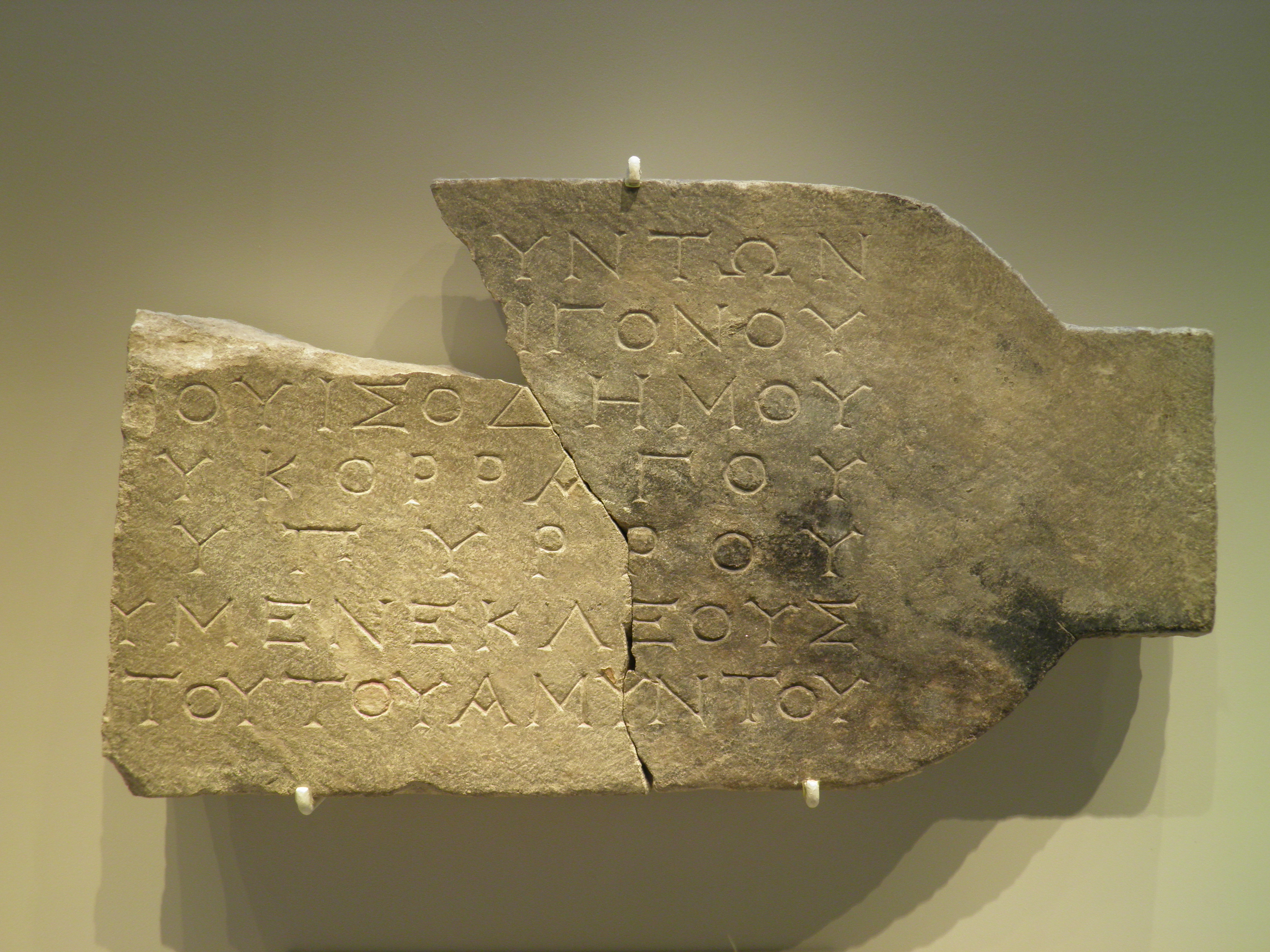
Left, an atrium with a pebble-mosaic paving, in Pella, Greece. Right, a fragmentary inscription bearing the names of six city archons (politarchs), 2nd century BC, Archaeological Museum of Pella.

The companions, including the elite companion cavalry and pezhetairoi infantry, represented a substantially larger group than the king's bodyguards. (Note: King 2010, p. 382. The ranks of the companions were greatly increased during the reign of Philip II when he expanded this institution to include Upper Macedonian aristocrats as well as Greeks. See: Sawada 2010, p. 404.) The most trusted or highest ranking companions formed a council that served as an advisory body to the king. A small amount of evidence suggests the existence of an assembly of the army during times of war and a people's assembly during times of peace. (Note: King 2010, p. 384: the first recorded instance dates to 359 BC, when Philip II called together assemblies to address them with a speech and raise their morale following the death of Perdiccas III of Macedon in battle against the Illyrians.)

Members of the council had the right to speak freely, and although there is no direct evidence that they voted on affairs of state, it is clear that the king was at least occasionally pressured to agree to their demands. The assembly was apparently given the right to judge cases of high treason and assign punishments for them, such as when Alexander the Great acted as prosecutor in the trial and conviction of three alleged conspirators in his father's assassination plot (while many others were acquitted). However, there is perhaps insufficient evidence to allow a conclusion that councils and assemblies were regularly upheld or constitutionally grounded, or that their decisions were always heeded by the king. At the death of Alexander the Great, the companions immediately formed a council to assume control of his empire, but it was soon destabilized by open rivalry and conflict between its members. The army also used mutiny as a tool to achieve political ends. (Note: For instance, when Perdiccas had Philip II's daughter Cynane murdered to prevent her own daughter Eurydice II of Macedon from marrying Philip III of Macedon, the army revolted and ensured that the marriage took place. See Adams 2010, p. 210 and Errington 1990, pp. 119–120 for details.)

=== Magistrates, the commonwealth, local government, and allied states ===
Antigonid Macedonian kings relied on various regional officials to conduct affairs of state. This included high-ranking municipal officials, such as the military strategos and the politarch, i.e. the elected governor (archon) of a large city (polis), as well as the politico-religious office of the epistates. (Note: King 2010, p. 390. Although these were highly influential members of local and regional government, Carol J. King asserts that they were not collectively powerful enough to formally challenge the authority of the Macedonian king or his right to rule.) No evidence exists about the personal backgrounds of these officials, although they may have been chosen among the same group of aristocratic philoi and hetairoi who filled vacancies for army officers.

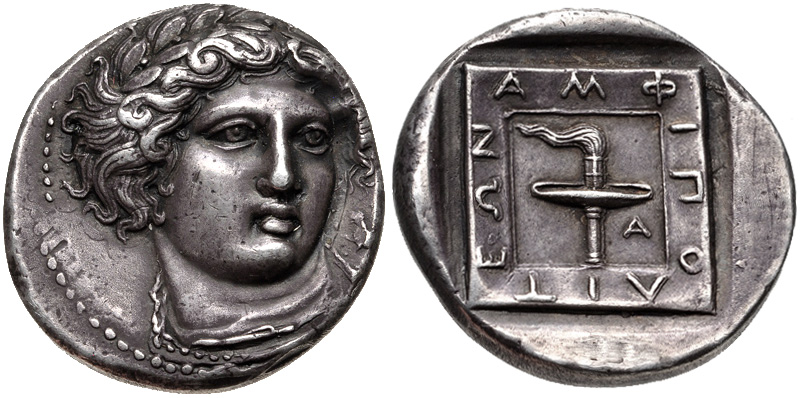
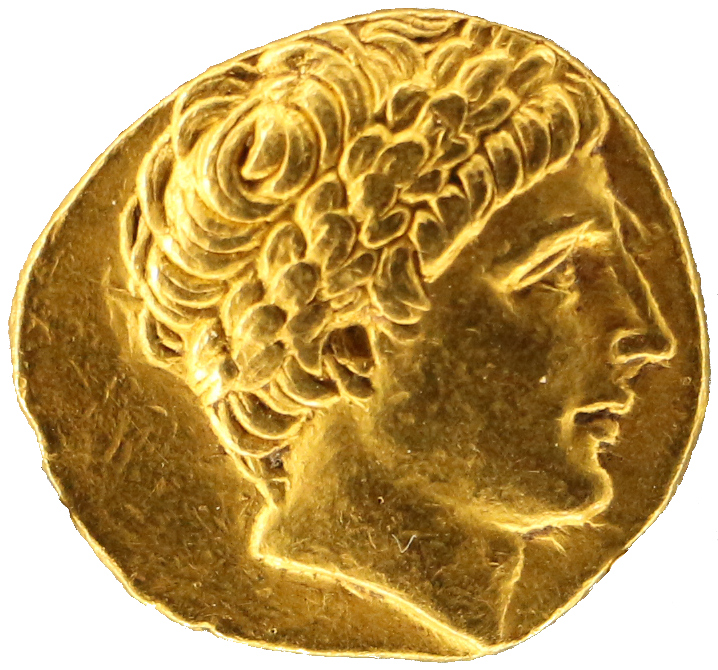
Left, a silver tetradrachm issued by the city of Amphipolis in 364–363 BC (before its conquest by Philip II of Macedon in 357 BC), showing the head of Apollo on the obverse and racing torch on the reverse. Right, a golden stater depicting Philip II, minted at Amphipolis in 340 BC (or later during Alexander's reign), shortly after its conquest by Philip II and incorporation into the Macedonian commonwealth

In ancient Athens, the Athenian democracy was restored on three separate occasions following the initial conquest of the city by Antipater in 322 BC. When it fell repeatedly under Macedonian rule it was governed by a Macedonian-imposed oligarchy composed of the wealthiest members of the city-state. (Note: Amemiya 2007, pp. 11–12: under Antipater's oligarchy, the lower value in terms of property for acceptable members of the oligarchy was 2,000 drachma. Athenian democracy was restored briefly after Antipater's death in 319 BC, yet his son Cassander reconquered the city, which came under the regency of Demetrius of Phalerum. Demetrius lowered the property limit for oligarchic members to 1,000 drachma, yet by 307 BC he was exiled from the city and direct democracy was restored. Demetrius I of Macedon reconquered Athens in 295 BC, yet democracy was once again restored in 287 BC with the aid of Ptolemy I of Egypt. Antigonus II Gonatas, son of Demetrius I, reconquered Athens in 260 BC, followed by a succession of Macedonian kings ruling over Athens until the Roman Republic conquered both Macedonia and then mainland Greece by 146 BC.) Other city-states were handled quite differently and were allowed a greater degree of autonomy. After Philip II conquered Amphipolis in 357 BC, the city was allowed to retain its democracy, including its constitution, popular assembly, city council (boule), and yearly elections for new officials, but a Macedonian garrison was housed within the city walls along with a Macedonian royal commissioner (epistates) to monitor the city's political affairs. Philippi, the city founded by Philip II, was the only other city in the Macedonian commonwealth that had a democratic government with popular assemblies, since the assembly (ecclesia) of Thessaloniki seems to have had only a passive function in practice. Some cities also maintained their own municipal revenues. The Macedonian king and central government administered the revenues generated by temples and priesthoods.

Within the Macedonian commonwealth, some evidence from the 3rd century BC indicates that foreign relations were handled by the central government. Although individual Macedonian cities nominally participated in Panhellenic events as independent entities, in reality, the granting of asylia (inviolability, diplomatic immunity, and the right of asylum at sanctuaries) to certain cities was handled directly by the king. Likewise, the city-states within contemporary Greek koina (i.e., federations of city-states, the sympoliteia) obeyed the federal decrees voted on collectively by the members of their league. (Note: Unlike the sparse Macedonian examples, ample textual evidence of this exists for the Achaean League, Acarnanian League, and Achaean League; see Hatzopoulos 1996, pp. 366–367.) In city-states belonging to a league or commonwealth, the granting of proxenia (i.e. the hosting of foreign ambassadors) was usually a right shared by local and central authorities. Abundant evidence exists for the granting of proxenia as being the sole prerogative of central authorities in the neighbouring Epirote League, and some evidence suggests the same arrangement in the Macedonian commonwealth. City-states that were allied with Macedonia issued their own decrees regarding proxenia. Foreign leagues also formed alliances with the Macedonian kings, such as when the Cretan League signed treaties with Demetrius II Aetolicus and Antigonus III Doson ensuring enlistment of Cretan mercenaries into the Macedonian army, and elected Philip V of Macedon as honorary protector (prostates) of the league.

=== Military ===
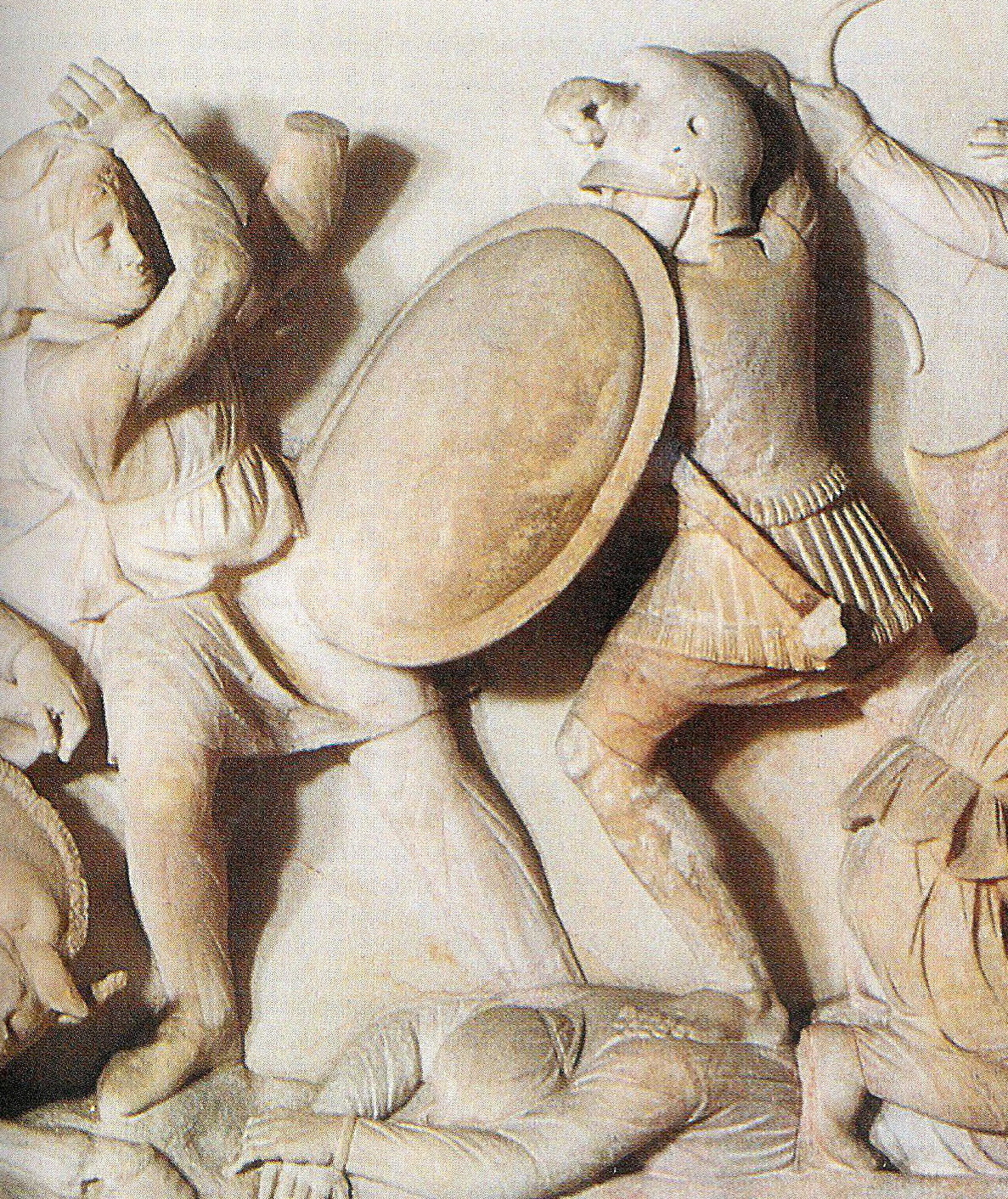
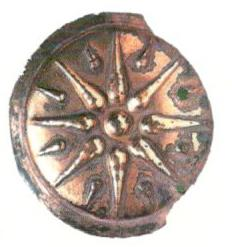
Left, a Macedonian infantryman, possibly a hypaspist, equipped with an aspis shield and wearing a linothorax cuirass and Thracian helmet; bas relief from the Alexander Sarcophagus, 4th century BC. Right, an ancient Macedonian bronze shield excavated from the archaeological site at Bonče in North Macedonia, dated 4th century BC.

==== Early Macedonian army ====
The basic structure of the Ancient Macedonian army was the division between the companion cavalry (hetairoi) and the foot companions (pezhetairoi), augmented by various allied troops, foreign levied soldiers, and mercenaries. The foot companions existed perhaps since the reign of Alexander I of Macedon. Macedonian cavalry, wearing muscled cuirasses, became renowned in Greece during and after their involvement in the Peloponnesian War, at times siding with either Athens or Sparta. Macedonian infantry in this period consisted of poorly trained shepherds and farmers, while the cavalry was composed of noblemen. As evidenced by early 4th century BC artwork, there was a pronounced Spartan influence on the Macedonian army before Philip II. Nicholas Viktor Sekunda states that at the beginning of Philip II's reign in 359 BC, the Macedonian army consisted of 10,000 infantry and 600 cavalry, yet Malcolm Errington cautions that these figures cited by ancient authors should be treated with some scepticism.

==== Philip II and Alexander the Great ====
After spending years as a political hostage in Thebes, Philip II sought to imitate the Greek example of martial exercises and the issuing of standard equipment for citizen soldiery, and succeeded in transforming the Macedonian army from a levied force of unprofessional farmers into a well-trained, professional army. Philip II adopted some of the military tactics of his enemies, such as the embolon (flying wedge) cavalry formation of the Scythians. His infantry wielded peltai shields that replaced the earlier aspis-style shields, were equipped with protective helmets, greaves, and either cuirasses breastplates or kotthybos stomach bands, and armed with sarissa pikes and daggers as secondary weapons. (Note: According to Sekunda, Philip II's infantry were eventually equipped with heavier armor such as cuirasses, since the Third Philippic of Demosthenes in 341 BC described them as hoplites instead of lighter peltasts: Sekunda 2010, pp. 449–450; see also Errington 1990, p. 238 for further details. However, Errington argues that breastplates were not worn by the phalanx pikemen of either Philip II or Philip V's reigns (during which sufficient evidence exists). Instead, he claims that breastplates were worn only by military officers, while pikemen wore the kotthybos stomach bands along with their helmets and greaves, wielding a daggers as secondary weapons along with their shields. See Errington 1990, p. 241.) The elite hypaspistai infantry, composed of handpicked men from the ranks of the pezhetairoi, were formed during the reign of Philip II and saw continued use during the reign of Alexander the Great. Philip II was also responsible for the establishment of the royal bodyguards (somatophylakes).

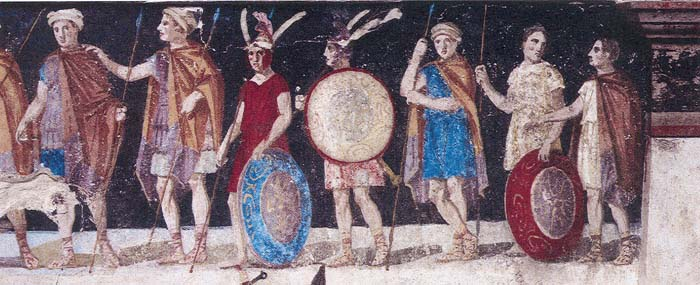
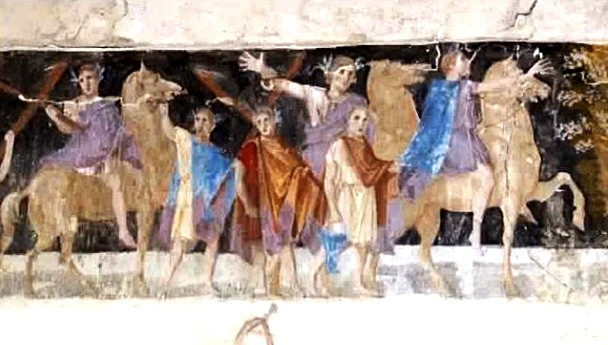
An ancient fresco of Macedonian soldiers from the tomb of Agios Athanasios, Thessaloniki, Greece, 4th century BC

For his lighter missile troops, Philip II employed mercenary Cretan archers as well as Thracian, Paeonian, and Illyrian javelin throwers, slingers, and archers. He hired engineers such as Polyidus of Thessaly and Diades of Pella, who were capable of building state of the art siege engines and artillery that fired large bolts. Following the acquisition of the lucrative mines at Krinides (renamed Philippi), the royal treasury could afford to field a permanent, professional standing army. The increase in state revenues under Philip II allowed the Macedonians to build a small navy for the first time, which included triremes.

The only Macedonian cavalry units attested under Alexander were the companion cavalry, yet he formed a hipparchia (i.e. unit of a few hundred horsemen) of companion cavalry composed entirely of ethnic Persians while campaigning in Asia. When marching his forces into Asia, Alexander brought 1,800 cavalrymen from Macedonia, 1,800 cavalrymen from Thessaly, 600 cavalrymen from the rest of Greece, and 900 prodromoi cavalry from Thrace. Antipater was able to quickly raise a force of 600 native Macedonian cavalry to fight in the Lamian War when it began in 323 BC. The most elite members of Alexander's hypaspistai were designated as the agema, and a new term for hypaspistai emerged after the Battle of Gaugamela in 331 BC: the argyraspides (silver shields). The latter continued to serve after the reign of Alexander the Great and may have been of Asian origin. (Note: Sekunda 2010, pp. 455–456. Errington 1990, p. 245: in regards to both the argyraspides and chalkaspides, "these titles were probably not functional, perhaps not even official.") Overall, his pike-wielding phalanx infantry numbered some 12,000 men, 3,000 of which were elite hypaspistai and 9,000 of which were pezhetairoi. (Note: Sekunda 2010, pp. 455–457. However, in discussing the discrepancies among ancient historians about the size of Alexander the Great's army, N. G. L. Hammond and F. W. Walbank choose Diodorus Siculus' figure of 32,000 infantry as the most reliable, while disagreeing with his figure for cavalry at 4,500, asserting it was closer to 5,100 horsemen. Hammond & Walbank 2001, pp. 22–23.) Alexander continued the use of Cretan archers and introduced native Macedonian archers into the army. After the Battle of Gaugamela, archers of West Asian backgrounds became commonplace.

==== Antigonid period military ====
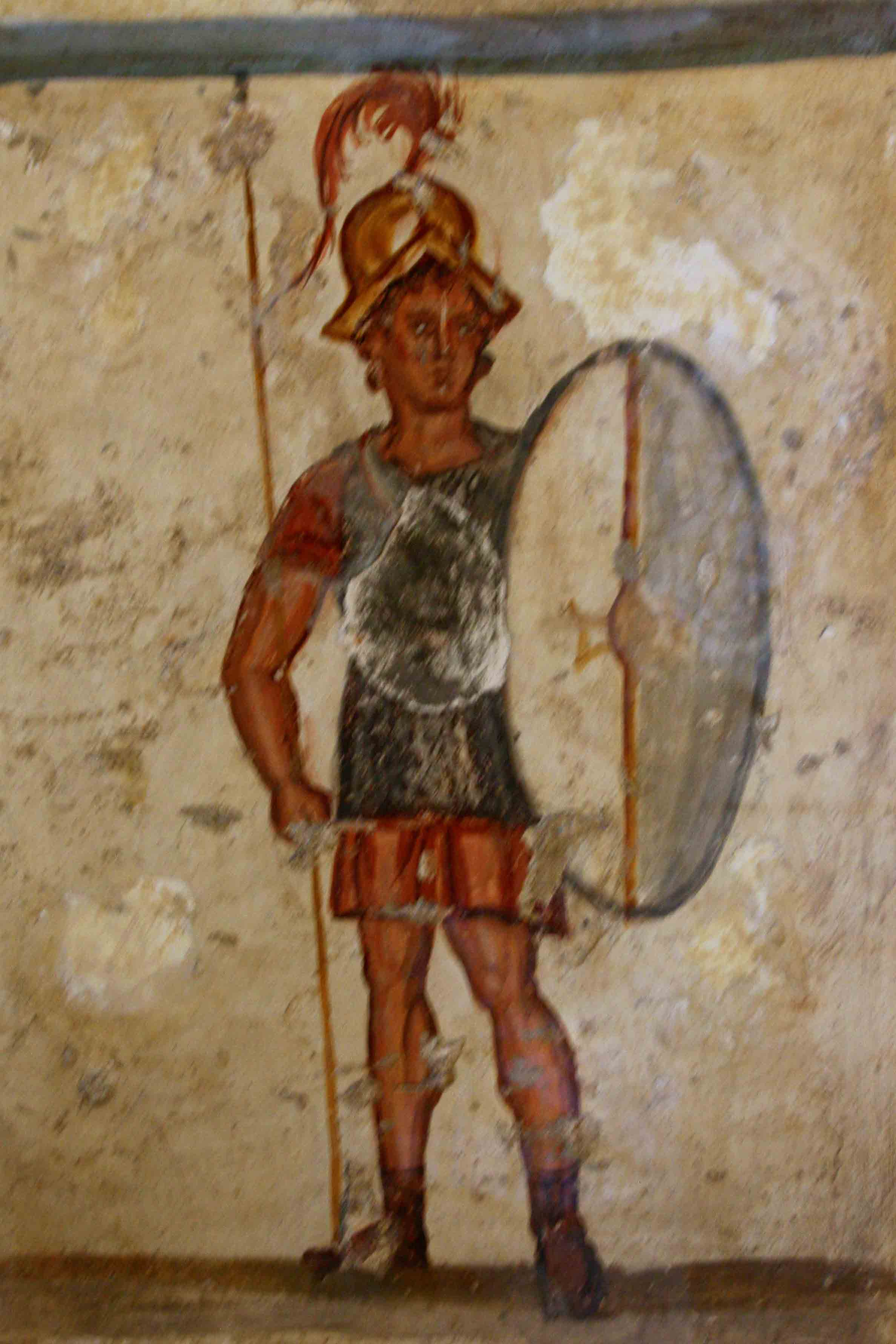
Fresco of an ancient Macedonian soldier (thorakites) wearing chainmail armour and bearing a thureos shield, 3rd century BC, İstanbul Archaeology Museums

The Macedonian army continued to evolve under the Antigonid dynasty. It is uncertain how many men were appointed as somatophylakes, which numbered eight men at the end of Alexander the Great's reign, while the hypaspistai seem to have morphed into assistants of the somatophylakes. (Note: Sekunda 2010, p. 459; Errington 1990, p. 245: "Other developments in Macedonian army organization are evident after Alexander. One is the evolution of the hypaspistai from an elite unit to a form of military police or bodyguard under Philip V; the only thing the two functions had in common was the particular closeness to the king.") At the Battle of Cynoscephalae in 197 BC, the Macedonians commanded some 16,000 phalanx pikemen. Alexander the Great's royal squadron of companion cavalry contained 800 men, the same number of cavalrymen in the sacred squadron (Latin: sacra ala; Greek: hiera ile) commanded by Philip V of Macedon during the Social War of 219 BC. The regular Macedonian cavalry numbered 3,000 at Callinicus, which was separate from the sacred squadron and royal cavalry. While Macedonian cavalry of the 4th century BC had fought without shields, the use of shields by cavalry was adopted from the Celtic invaders of the 270s BC who settled in Galatia, central Anatolia.

Thanks to contemporary inscriptions from Amphipolis and Greia dated 218 and 181 BC, respectively, historians have been able to partially piece together the organization of the Antigonid army under Philip V. (Note: Sekunda 2010, pp. 460–461; for the evolution of Macedonian military titles, such as its command by tetrarchai officers assisted by grammateis (i.e. secretaries or clerks), see Errington 1990, pp. 242–243.) From at least the time of Antigonus III Doson, the most elite Antigonid-period infantry were the peltasts, lighter and more maneuverable soldiers wielding peltai javelins, swords, and a smaller bronze shield than Macedonian phalanx pikemen, although they sometimes served in that capacity. (Note: Sekunda 2010, pp. 461–462; Errington 1990, p. 245: "The other development, which happened at the latest under Doson, was the formation and training of a special unit of peltastai separate from the phalanx. This unit operated as a form of royal guard similar in function to the earlier hypaspistai.") Among the peltasts, roughly 2,000 men were selected to serve in the elite agema vanguard, with other peltasts numbering roughly 3,000. The number of peltasts varied over time, perhaps never more than 5,000 men. (Note: Sekunda 2010, p. 463; the largest figure for elite Macedonian peltasts mentioned by ancient historians was 5,000 troops, an amount that existed in the Social War (220–217 BC).) They fought alongside the phalanx pikemen, divided now into chalkaspides (bronze shield) and leukaspides (white shield) regiments.

The Antigonid Macedonian kings continued to expand and equip the navy. Cassander maintained a small fleet at Pydna, Demetrius I of Macedon had one at Pella, and Antigonus II Gonatas, while serving as a general for Demetrius in Greece, used the navy to secure the Macedonian holdings in Demetrias, Chalkis, Piraeus, and Corinth. The navy was considerably expanded during the Chremonidean War (267–261 BC), allowing the Macedonian navy to defeat the Ptolemaic Egyptian navy at the 255 BC Battle of Cos and 245 BC Battle of Andros, and enabling Macedonian influence to spread over the Cyclades. Antigonus III Doson used the Macedonian navy to invade Caria, while Philip V sent 200 ships to fight in the Battle of Chios in 201 BC. The Macedonian navy was reduced to a mere six vessels as agreed in the 197 BC peace treaty that concluded the Second Macedonian War with the Roman Republic, although Perseus of Macedon quickly assembled some lemboi at the outbreak of the Third Macedonian War in 171 BC.

== Society and culture ==
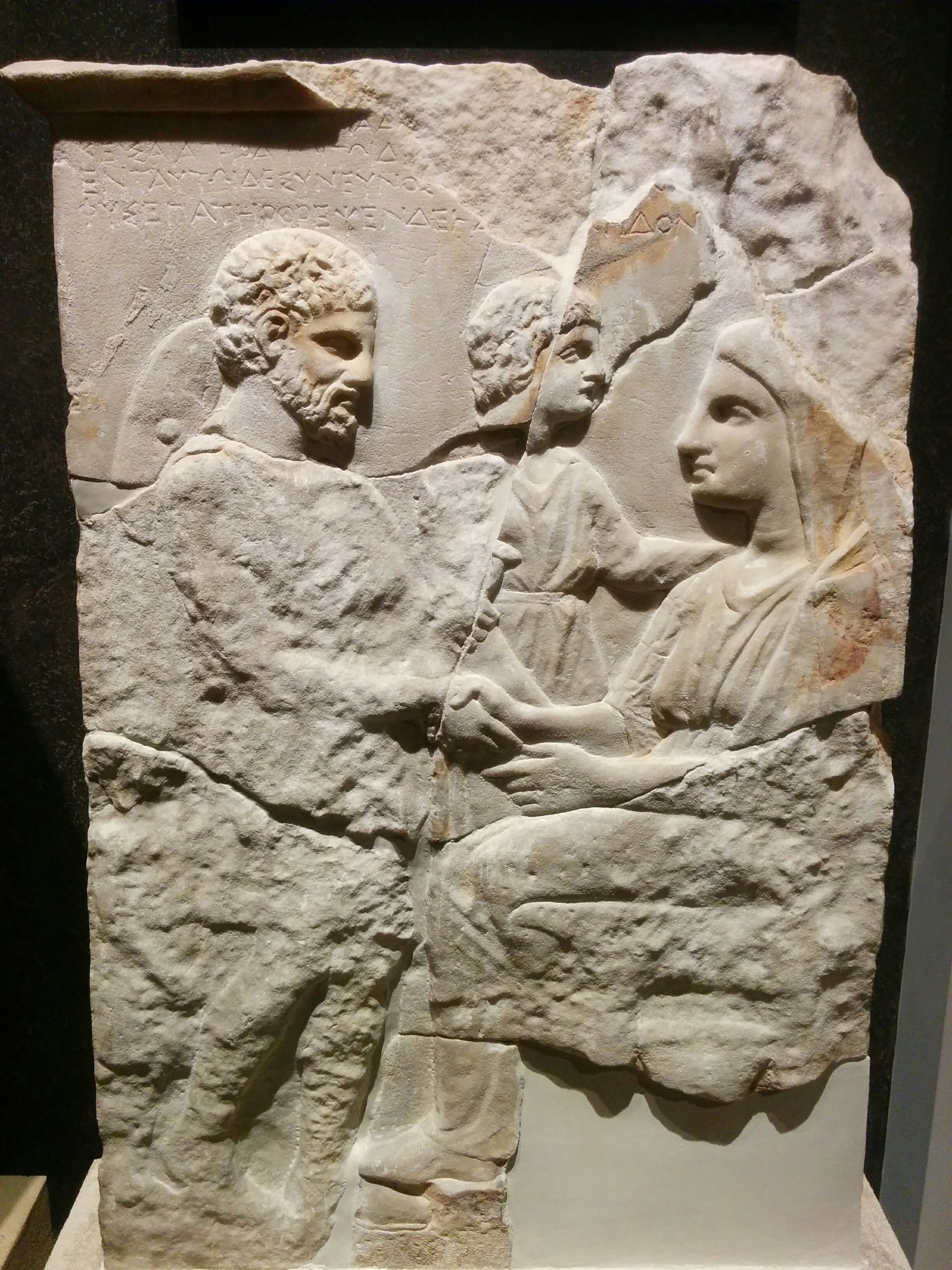
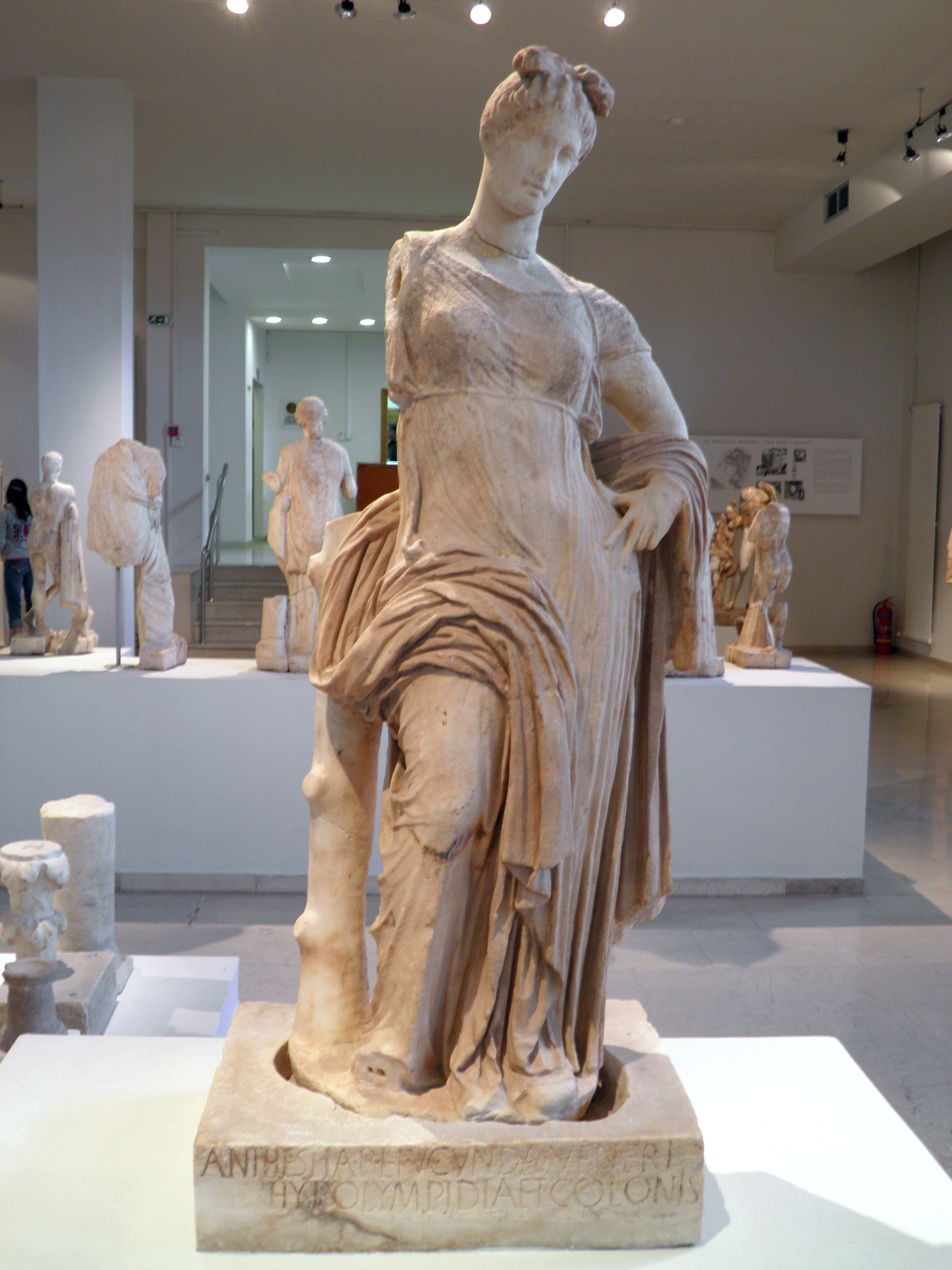
Left, a Macedonian funerary stele, with an epigram in Greek, mid-4th century BC, Vergina. Right, marble cult statue of Aphrodite Hypolympidia, dated 2nd century BC, from the sanctuary of Isis at Dion, Pieria, Central Macedonia, Greece, now in the Archaeological Museum of Dion.

=== Language and dialects ===
Following its adoption as the court language of Philip II of Macedon's regime, authors of ancient Macedonia wrote their works in Koine Greek, the lingua franca of late Classical and Hellenistic Greece. (Note: Hatzopoulos 2011a, p. 44; Woodard 2010, p. 9; see also Austin 2006, p. 4 for further details. Edward M. Anson contends that the native spoken language of the Macedonians was a dialect of Greek and that in the roughly 6,300 Macedonian-period inscriptions discovered by archaeologists about 99% were written in the Greek language, using the Greek alphabet. Anson 2010, p. 17, n. 57, n. 58.) Rare textual evidence indicates that the native Macedonian language was either a dialect of Greek similar to Thessalian Greek and Northwest Greek, (Note: Crespo 2023, p. 77; Lamont 2023, p. 121; van Beek 2022, pp. 190–191; Hatzopoulos 2020, p. 64; Brixhe 2018, pp. 1862–1867; Crespo 2017, p. 329; Hatzopoulos 2017, p. 299; Giannakis 2017, p. 18: "Recent scholarship has established the position of (ancient) Macedonian within the dialect map of North-West Greek (see, among others, Méndez Dosuna 2012, 2014, 2015; Crespo 2012, 2015). Here belongs the study by M. Hatzopoulos, who offers a critical review of recent research on the Macedonian dialect, arguing that all available evidence points to the conclusion that this is a Greek dialect of the North-West group."; Hatzopoulos 2011a, p. 44; Engels 2010, pp. 94–95; Woodard 2010, pp. 9–10. Hatzopoulos 2011a, pp. 43–45 states that the native language of the ancient Macedonians as preserved in the rare documents written in a language other than Koine Greek also betray a slight phonetic influence from the languages of the original inhabitants of the region who were assimilated or expelled by the invading Macedonians; Hatzopoulos also asserts that little is known about these languages aside from Phrygian spoken by the Bryges who migrated to Anatolia. Errington 1990, pp. 3–4 affirms that the Macedonian language was merely a dialect of Greek that used loanwords from Thracian and Illyrian languages, which "does not surprise modern philologists" but ultimately provided Macedonia's political enemies with the "proof" they needed to level the charge that Macedonians were not Greek.) or a language closely related to Greek. (Note: Woodard 2004, pp. 12–14; Hamp, Eric; Adams, Douglas (2013). "The Expansion of the Indo-European Languages ", Sino-Platonic Papers, vol 239. Accessed 16 January 2017. Joseph 2001: "Ancient Greek is generally taken to be the only representative (though note the existence of different dialects) of the Greek or Hellenic branch of Indo-European. There is some dispute as to whether Ancient Macedonian (the native language of Philip and Alexander), if it has any special affinity to Greek at all, is a dialect within Greek (see below) or a sibling language to all the known Ancient Greek dialects. If the latter view is correct, then Macedonian and Greek would be the two subbranches of a group within Indo-European which could more properly be called Hellenic." Georgiev 1966, pp. 285–297: ancient Macedonian is closely related to Greek, and Macedonian and Greek are descended from a common Greek-Macedonian idiom that was spoken till about the second half of the 3rd millennium BC.) The Pella curse tablet has been forwarded as an argument that Ancient Macedonian was a variety of Northwest Greek. The vast majority of surviving inscriptions from ancient Macedonia were written in Attic Greek and its successor Koine Greek. Attic (and later Koine) Greek was the preferred language of the Ancient Macedonian army, although it is known that Alexander the Great once shouted an emergency order in Macedonian to his royal guards during the drinking party where he killed Cleitus the Black. Macedonian became extinct in either the Hellenistic or the Roman period, and entirely replaced by Koine Greek. (Note: For instance, Cleopatra VII Philopator, the last active ruler of the Ptolemaic dynasty in Egypt, spoke Koine Greek as a first language and by her reign (51–30 BC) or some time before it the Macedonian language was no longer used. See Jones 2006, pp. 33–34.)

=== Religious beliefs and funerary practices ===
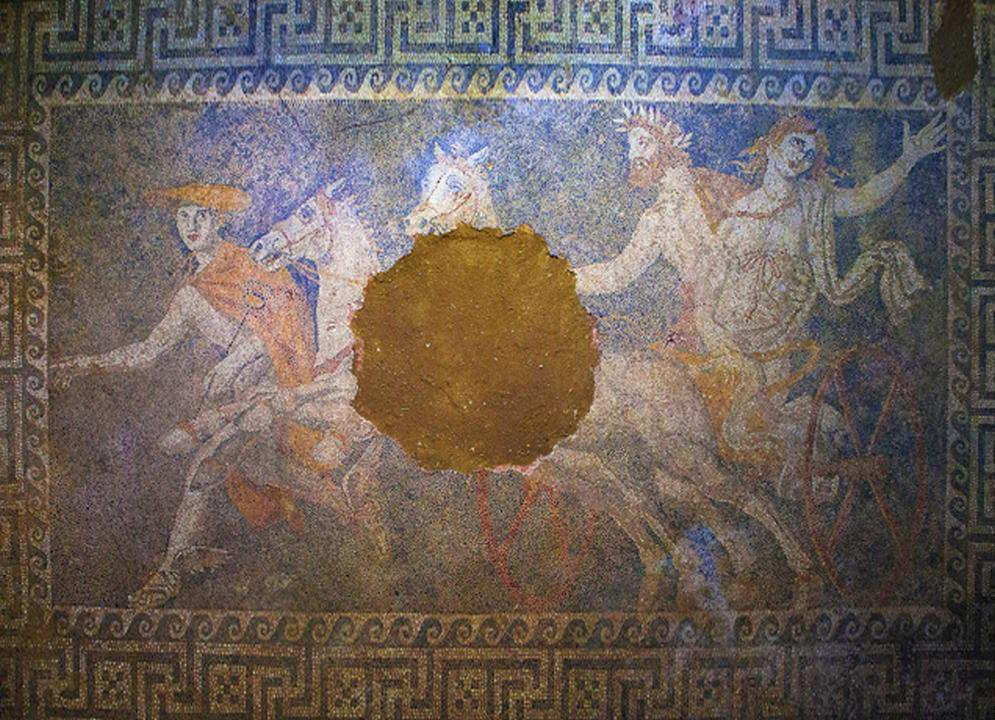
A mosaic of the Kasta Tomb in Amphipolis depicting the abduction of Persephone by Pluto, 4th century BC

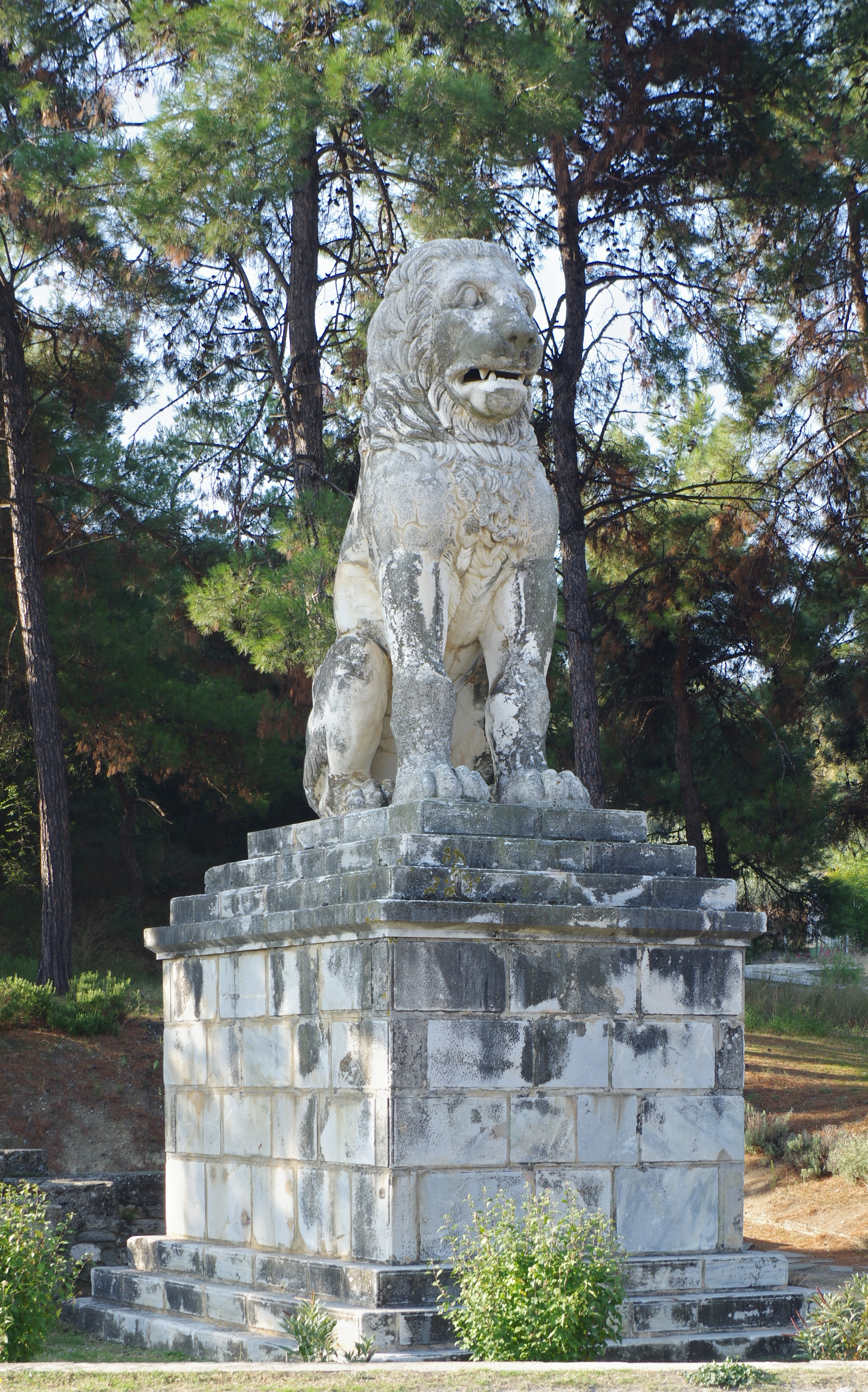
The Lion of Amphipolis in Amphipolis, northern Greece, a 4th-century BC marble tomb sculpture erected in honor of Laomedon of Mytilene, a general who served under Alexander the Great

By the 5th century BC, the Macedonians and the southern Greeks worshipped more or less the same deities of the Greek pantheon. In Macedonia, political and religious offices were often intertwined. For instance, the head of state for the city of Amphipolis also served as the priest of Asklepios, Greek god of medicine; a similar arrangement existed at Cassandreia, where a cult priest honoring the city's founder Cassander was the nominal head of the city. The main sanctuary of Zeus was maintained at Dion, while another at Veria was dedicated to Herakles and was patronized by Demetrius II Aetolicus (r. 239–229 BC). Meanwhile, foreign cults from Egypt were fostered by the royal court, such as the temple of Sarapis at Thessaloniki. The Macedonians also had relations with "international" cults; for example, Macedonian kings Philip III of Macedon and Alexander IV of Macedon made votive offerings to the internationally esteemed Samothrace temple complex of the Cabeiri mystery cult.

In the three royal tombs at Vergina, professional painters decorated the walls with a mythological scene of Hades abducting Persephone and royal hunting scenes, while lavish grave goods including weapons, armour, drinking vessels, and personal items were housed with the dead, whose bones were burned before burial in golden coffins. Some grave goods and decorations were common in other Macedonian tombs, yet some items found at Vergina were distinctly tied to royalty, including a diadem, luxurious goods, and arms and armour. Scholars have debated about the identity of the tomb occupants since the discovery of their remains in 1977–1978, and recent research and forensic examination have concluded that at least one of the persons buried was Philip II. (Note: Sansone 2017, p. 224; Hammond & Walbank 2001, p. 6. Rosella Lorenzi (10 October 2014). "Remains of Alexander the Great's Father Confirmed Found: King Philip II's bones are buried in a tomb along with a mysterious woman-warrior." Seeker. Retrieved 17 January 2017.) Located near Tomb 1 are the above-ground ruins of a heroon, a shrine for cult worship of the dead. In 2014, the ancient Macedonian Kasta Tomb was discovered outside of Amphipolis and is the largest ancient tomb found in Greece (as of 2017).

=== Economics and social class ===
Young Macedonian men were typically expected to engage in hunting and martial combat as a by-product of their transhumance lifestyle of herding livestock such as goats and sheep, while horse breeding and raising cattle were other common pursuits. Some Macedonians engaged in farming, often with irrigation, land reclamation, and horticulture activities supported by the Macedonian state. (Note: Hatzopoulos 2011a, pp. 47–48; for a specific example of land reclamation near Amphipolis during the reign of Alexander the Great, see Hammond & Walbank 2001, p. 31.) The Macedonian economy and state finances were mainly supported by logging and by mining valuable minerals such as copper, iron, gold, and silver. The conversion of these raw materials into finished products and the sale of those products encouraged the growth of urban centres and a gradual shift away from the traditional rustic Macedonian lifestyle during the course of the 5th century BC.

The Macedonian king was an autocratic figure at the head of both government and society, with arguably unlimited authority to handle affairs of state and public policy, but he was also the leader of a very personal regime with close relationships or connections to his hetairoi, the core of the Macedonian aristocracy. These aristocrats were second only to the king in terms of power and privilege, filling the ranks of his administration and serving as commanding officers in the military. It was in the more bureaucratic regimes of the Hellenistic kingdoms that succeeded Alexander the Great's empire where greater social mobility for members of society seeking to join the aristocracy could be found, especially in Ptolemaic Egypt. Although governed by a king and martial aristocracy, Macedonia seems to have lacked the widespread use of slaves seen in contemporaneous Greek states.

=== Visual arts ===
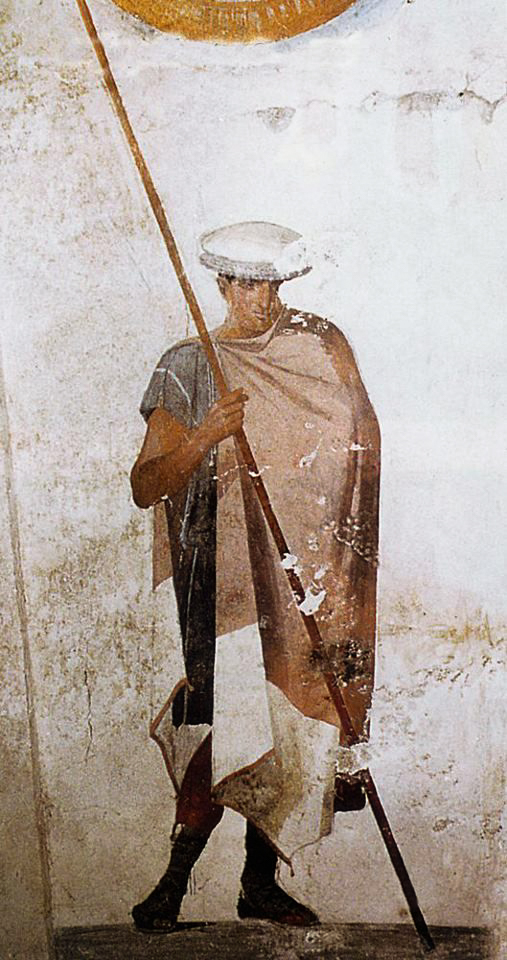
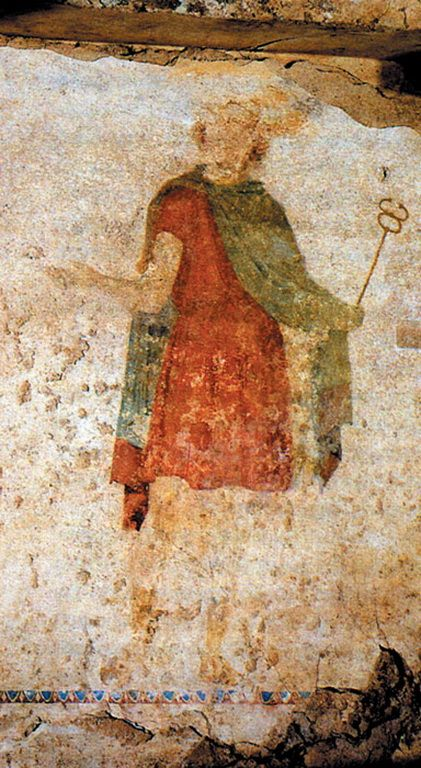
Left, a fresco of a Macedonian soldier resting a spear and wearing a cap, from the tomb of Agios Athanasios, Thessaloniki, 4th century BC. Right, fresco from the Tomb of Judgement in ancient Mieza (modern-day Lefkadia), Imathia, Central Macedonia, Greece, depicting religious imagery of the afterlife, 4th century BC.

By the reign of Archelaus I in the 5th century BC, the ancient Macedonian elite was importing customs and artistic traditions from other regions of Greece while retaining more archaic, perhaps Homeric, funerary rites connected with the symposium that were typified by items such as the decorative metal kraters that held the ashes of deceased Macedonian nobility in their tombs. Among these is the large bronze Derveni Krater from a 4th-century BC tomb of Thessaloniki, decorated with scenes of the Greek god Dionysus and his entourage and belonging to an aristocrat who had had a military career. Macedonian metalwork usually followed Athenian styles of vase shapes from the 6th century BC onward, with drinking vessels, jewellery, containers, crowns, diadems, and coins among the many metal objects found in Macedonian tombs.

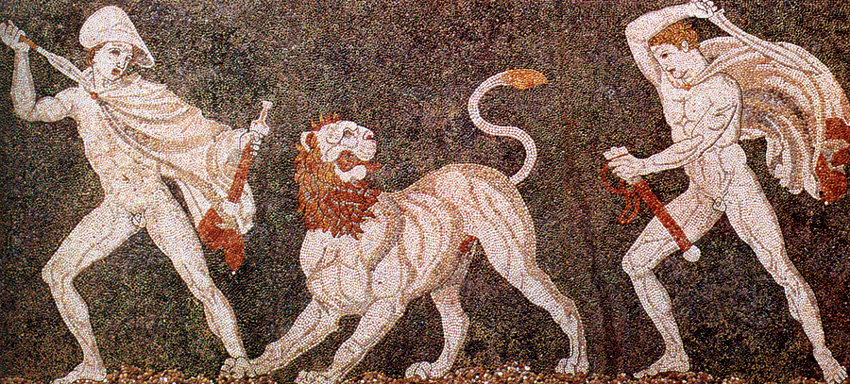
Alexander (left), wearing a kausia and fighting an Asiatic lion with his friend Craterus (detail); late 4th-century BC mosaic, Pella Museum.

Surviving Macedonian painted artwork includes frescoes and murals, but also decoration on sculpted artwork such as statues and reliefs. For instance, trace colours still exist on the bas-reliefs of the late 4th-century BC Alexander Sarcophagus. Macedonian paintings have allowed historians to investigate the clothing fashions as well as military gear worn by the ancient Macedonians. Aside from metalwork and painting, mosaics are another significant form of surviving Macedonian artwork. The Stag Hunt Mosaic of Pella, with its three-dimensional qualities and illusionist style, show clear influence from painted artwork and wider Hellenistic art trends, although the rustic theme of hunting was tailored to Macedonian tastes. The similar Lion Hunt Mosaic of Pella illustrates either a scene of Alexander the Great with his companion Craterus, or simply a conventional illustration of the royal diversion of hunting. Mosaics with mythological themes include scenes of Dionysus riding a panther and Helen of Troy being abducted by Theseus, the latter of which employs illusionist qualities and realistic shading similar to Macedonian paintings. Common themes of Macedonian paintings and mosaics include warfare, hunting, and aggressive masculine sexuality (i.e. abduction of women for rape or marriage); these subjects are at times combined within a single work and perhaps indicate a metaphorical connection. (Note: This metaphorical connection between warfare, hunting, and aggressive masculine sexuality seems to be affirmed by later Byzantine literature, particularly in the Acritic songs about Digenes Akritas. See Cohen 2010, pp. 13–34 for details.)

=== Theatre, music and performing arts ===
Philip II was assassinated in 336 BC at the theatre of Aigai, amid games and spectacles celebrating the marriage of his daughter Cleopatra. Alexander the Great was allegedly a great admirer of both theatre and music. He was especially fond of the plays by Classical Athenian tragedians Aeschylus, Sophocles, and Euripides, whose works formed part of a proper Greek education for his new eastern subjects alongside studies in the Greek language, including the epics of Homer. While he and his army were stationed at Tyre (in modern-day Lebanon), Alexander had his generals act as judges not only for athletic contests but also for stage performances of Greek tragedies. The contemporaneous famous actors Thessalus and Athenodorus performed at the event. (Note: The actor Athenodorus performed despite risking a fine for being absent from the simultaneous Dionysia festival of Athens where he was scheduled to perform (a fine that his patron Alexander agreed to pay). SeeWorthington 2014, pp. 185–186 for details.)

Music was also appreciated in Macedonia. In addition to the agora, the gymnasium, the theatre, and religious sanctuaries and temples dedicated to Greek gods and goddesses, one of the main markers of a true Greek city in the empire of Alexander the Great was the presence of an odeon for musical performances. This was the case not only for Alexandria in Egypt, but also for cities as distant as Ai-Khanoum in what is now modern-day Afghanistan.

=== Literature, education, philosophy, and patronage ===
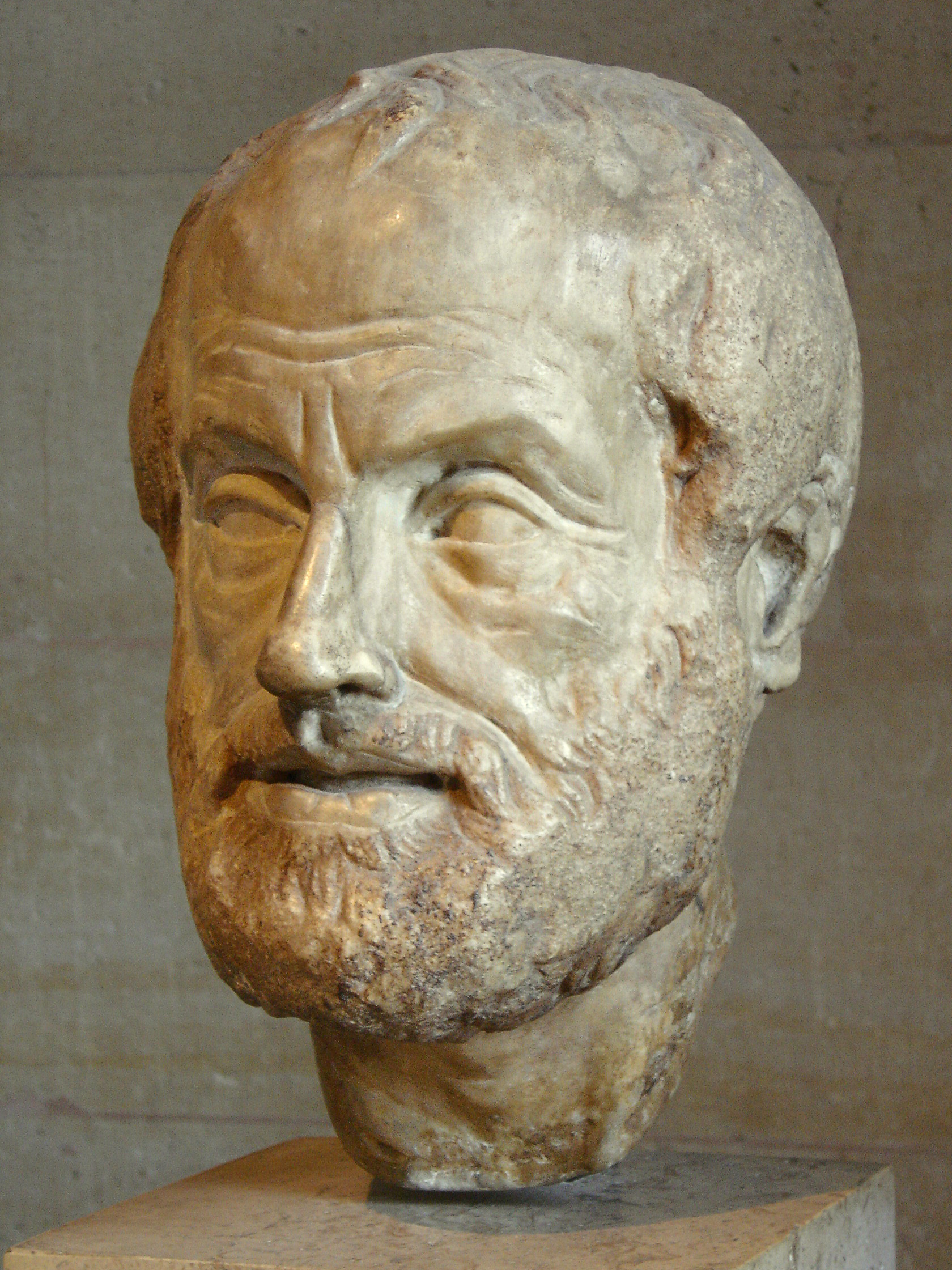
Portrait bust of Aristotle, an Imperial Roman (1st or 2nd century AD) copy of a lost bronze sculpture made by Lysippos

Perdiccas II of Macedon was able to host well-known Classical Greek intellectual visitors at his royal court, such as the lyric poet Melanippides and the renowned medical doctor Hippocrates, and Pindar's enkomion written for Alexander I of Macedon may have been composed at his court. Archelaus I received many more Greek scholars, artists, and celebrities at his court than his predecessors. His honored guests included the painter Zeuxis, the architect Callimachus, the poets Choerilus of Samos, Timotheus of Miletus, and Agathon, as well as the famous Athenian playwright Euripides. (Note: Hatzopoulos 2011b, p. 59; Sansone 2017, p. 223; Roisman 2010, p. 157. Although Archelaus I of Macedon was criticized by the philosopher Plato, supposedly hated by Socrates, and the first known Macedonian king to be given the label of barbarian, the historian Thucydides held the Macedonian king in glowing admiration, especially for his engagement in Panhellenic sports and fostering of literary culture. See Hatzopoulos 2011b, p. 59.) The philosopher Aristotle, who studied at the Platonic Academy of Athens and established the Aristotelian school of thought, moved to Macedonia, and is said to have tutored the young Alexander the Great, as well as serving as an esteemed diplomat for Philip II. Among Alexander's retinue of artists, writers, and philosophers was Pyrrho of Elis, founder of Pyrrhonism, the school of philosophical scepticism. During the Antigonid period, Antigonos Gonatas fostered cordial relationships with Menedemos of Eretria, founder of the Eretrian school of philosophy, and Zenon, the founder of Stoicism.

In terms of early Greek historiography and later Roman historiography, Felix Jacoby identified thirteen possible ancient historians who wrote about Macedonia in his Fragmente der griechischen Historiker. Aside from accounts in Herodotus and Thucydides, the works compiled by Jacoby are only fragmentary, whereas other works are completely lost, such as the history of an Illyrian war fought by Perdiccas III written by Antipater. The Macedonian historians Marsyas of Pella and Marsyas of Philippi wrote histories of Macedonia, the Ptolemaic king Ptolemy I Soter authored a history about Alexander, and Hieronymus of Cardia wrote a history about Alexander's royal successors. (Note: Errington 1990, pp. 224–225. For Marsyas of Pella, see also Hammond & Walbank 2001, p. 27 for further details.) Following the Indian campaign of Alexander the Great, the Macedonian military officer Nearchus wrote a work of his voyage from the mouth of the Indus river to the Persian Gulf. The Macedonian historian Craterus published a compilation of decrees made by the popular assembly of the Athenian democracy, ostensibly while attending the school of Aristotle. Philip V of Macedon had manuscripts of the history of Philip II written by Theopompus gathered by his court scholars and disseminated with further copies.

=== Sports and leisure ===
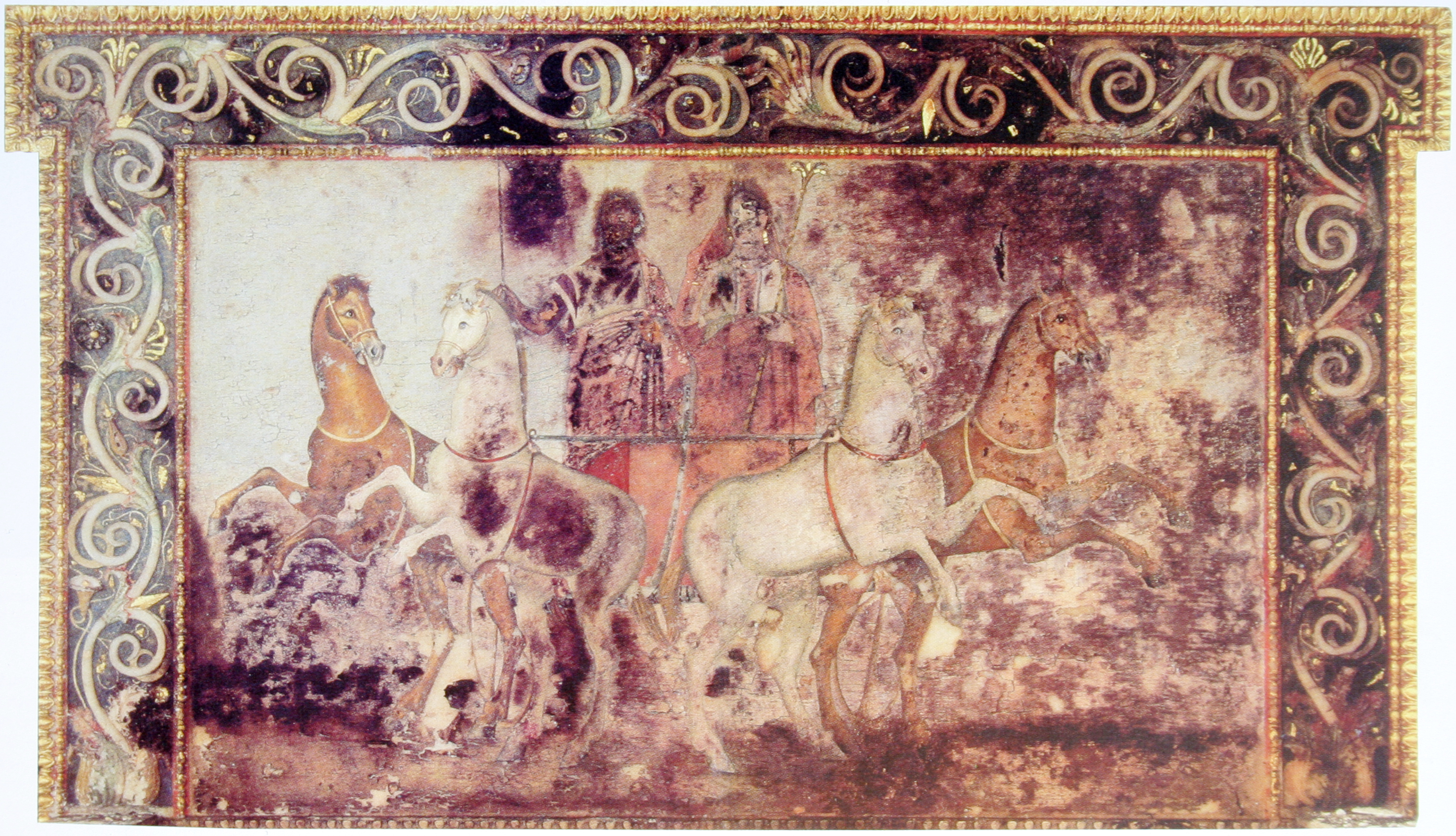
A fresco showing Hades and Persephone riding in a chariot, from the tomb of Queen Eurydice I of Macedon at Vergina, Greece, 4th century BC

When Alexander I of Macedon petitioned to compete in the foot race of the ancient Olympic Games, the event organizers at first denied his request, explaining that only Greeks were allowed to compete. However, Alexander I produced proof of an Argead royal genealogy showing ancient Argive Temenid lineage, a move that ultimately convinced the Olympic Hellanodikai authorities of his Greek descent and ability to compete. By the end of the 5th century BC, the Macedonian king Archelaus I was crowned with the olive wreath at both Olympia and Delphi (in the Pythian Games) for winning chariot racing contests. Philip II allegedly heard of the Olympic victory of his horse (in either an individual horse race or chariot race) on the same day his son Alexander the Great was born, on either 19 or 20 July 356 BC. Non-royal Macedonians also competed in and won various Olympic contests by the 4th century BC. In addition to literary contests, Alexander the Great staged competitions for music and athletics across his empire.

=== Dining and cuisine ===
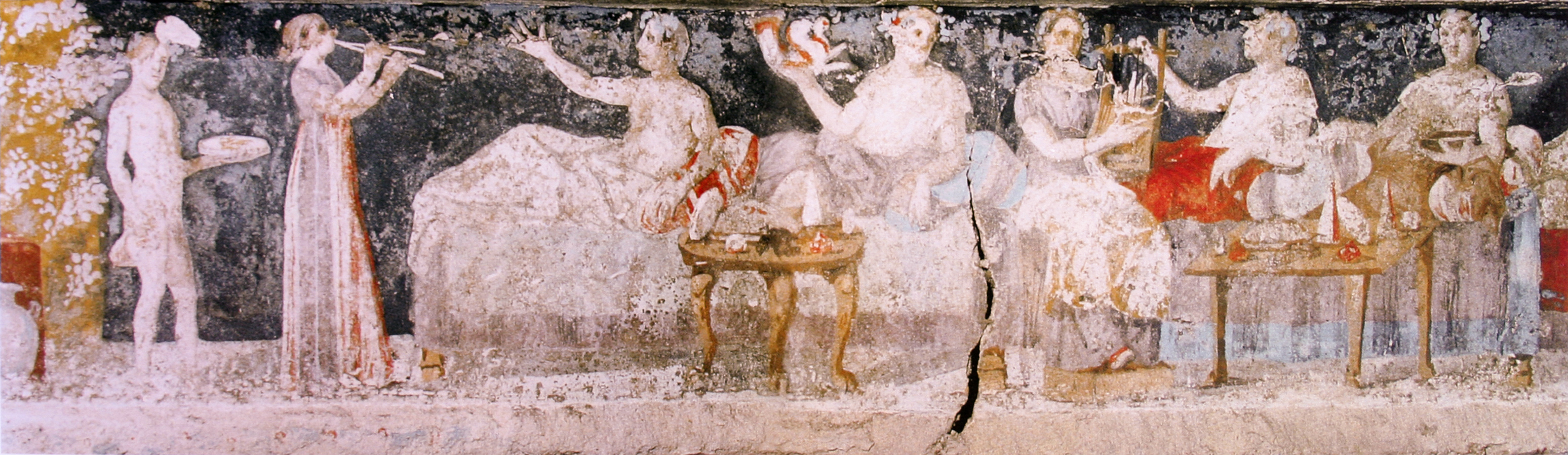
A banquet scene from a Macedonian tomb of Agios Athanasios, Thessaloniki, 4th century BC; shown are six men reclining on couches, with food arranged on nearby tables, a male servant in attendance, and female musicians providing entertainment.

Ancient Macedonia produced only a few fine foods or beverages that were highly appreciated elsewhere in the Greek world, including eels from the Strymonian Gulf and special wine produced in Chalcidice. The earliest known use of flat bread as a plate for meat was made in Macedonia during the 3rd century BC, which perhaps influenced the later trencher bread of medieval Europe. Cattle and goats were consumed, although there was no notice of Macedonian mountain cheeses in literature until the Middle Ages. The comedic playwright Menander wrote that Macedonian dining habits penetrated Athenian high society; for instance, the introduction of meats into the dessert course of a meal. The Macedonians also most likely introduced mattye to Athenian cuisine, a dish usually made of chicken or other spiced, salted, and sauced meats served during the wine course. This particular dish was derided and connected with licentiousness and drunkenness in a play by the Athenian comic poet Alexis about the declining morals of Athenians in the age of Demetrius I of Macedon.

The symposium in the Macedonian and wider Greek realm was a banquet for the nobility and privileged class, an occasion for feasting, drinking, entertainment, and sometimes philosophical discussion. The hetairoi, leading members of the Macedonian aristocracy, were expected to attend such feasts with their king. They were also expected to accompany him on royal hunts for the acquisition of game meat as well as for sport.

=== Ethnic identity ===
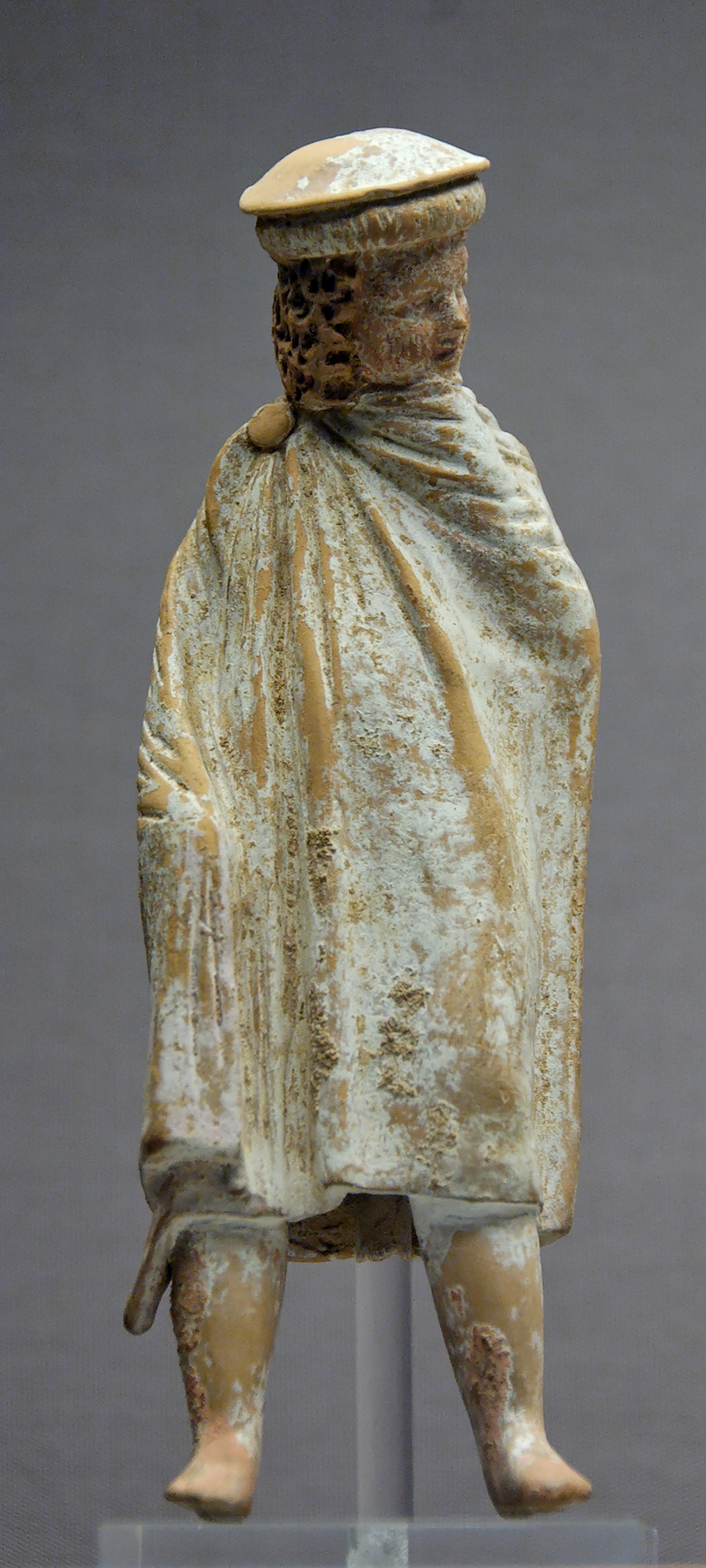
Athenian terracotta figurine, c. 300 BC.

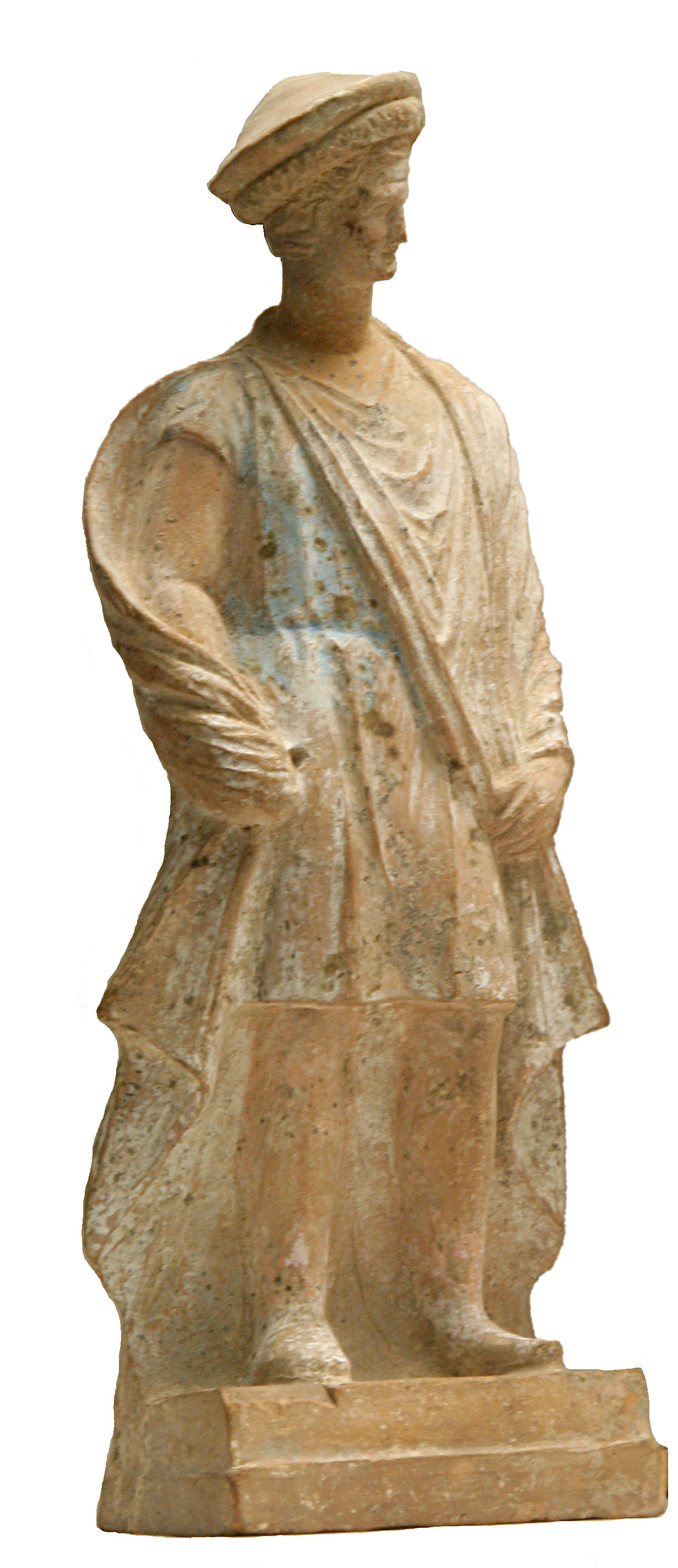
Macedonian terracotta figurine, 3rd century BC

Terracotta statues depicting ancient Macedonians wearing the kausia, a headgear that led the Persians to refer to the Macedonians as "Yaunã Takabara" ("Greeks with hats that look like shields").

Ancient authors and modern scholars alike disagree about the precise ethnic identity of the ancient Macedonians. The predominant viewpoint supports that the Macedonians were "truly Greeks" who had just retained a more archaic lifestyle than those living in southern parts of Greece. Ernst Badian notes however that nearly all surviving references to antagonisms and differences between Greeks and Macedonians exist in the written speeches of Arrian, who lived at the time of the Roman Empire, when any notion of an ethnic disparity between Macedonians and other Greeks was incomprehensible. Hatzopoulos argues that there was no real ethnic difference between Macedonians and the other Greeks, only a political distinction contrived after the creation of the League of Corinth in 337 BC (which was led by Macedonia through the league's elected hegemon Philip II, when he was not a member of the league itself); (Note: Hatzopoulos 2011b, pp. 69–71. Hatzopoulos stresses the fact that Macedonians and other peoples such as the Epirotes and Cypriots, despite speaking a Greek dialect, worshiping in Greek cults, engaging in Panhellenic games, and upholding traditional Greek institutions, nevertheless occasionally had their territories excluded from contemporary geographic definitions of "Hellas" and were even considered barbarians by some. See: Hatzopoulos 2011b, pp. 52, 71–72; Johannes Engels comes to a similar conclusion about the comparison between Macedonians and Epirotes, saying that the "Greekness" of the Epirotes, despite them not being considered as refined as southern Greeks, never came into question. Engels suggests this perhaps because the Epirotes did not try to dominate the Greek world as Philip II of Macedon had done. See: Engels 2010, pp. 83–84.) N. G. L. Hammond asserts that ancient views differentiating Macedonia's ethnic identity from the rest of the Greek-speaking world should be seen as an expression of conflict between two different political systems: the democratic system of the city-states (e.g. Athens) versus the monarchy (Macedonia). Other academics who concur that the difference between the Macedonians and Greeks was a political rather than a true ethnic discrepancy include Michael B. Sakellariou, Malcolm Errington, (Note: Errington 1990, pp. 3–4. Errington 1994, p. 4: "Ancient allegations that the Macedonians were non-Greek all had their origin in Athens at the time of the struggle with Philip II. Then as now, political struggle created the prejudice. The orator Aeschines once even found it necessary, to counteract the prejudice vigorously fomented by his opponents, to defend Philip on this issue and describe him at a meeting of the Athenian Popular Assembly as being 'entirely Greek'. Demosthenes' allegations were lent an appearance of credibility by the fact, apparent to every observer, that the life-style of the Macedonians, being determined by specific geographical and historical conditions, was different to that of a Greek city-state. This alien way of life was, however, common to western Greeks of Epirus, Akarnania and Aitolia, as well as to the Macedonians, and their fundamental Greek nationality was never doubted. Only as a consequence of the political disagreement with Macedonia was the issue raised at all.") and Craige B. Champion. (Note: Champion 2004, p. 41: "Demosthenes could drop the barbarian category altogether in advocating an Athenian alliance with the Great King against a power that ranked below any so-called barbarian people, the Macedonians. In the case of Aeschines, Philip II could be 'a barbarian due for the vengeance of God', but after the orator's embassy to Pella in 346, he became a 'thorough Greek', devoted to Athens. It all depended upon one's immediate political orientation with Macedonia, which many Greeks instinctively scorned, was always infused with deep-seated ambivalence.")

Anson argues that some Hellenic authors expressed complex or even ever-changing and ambiguous ideas about the exact ethnic identity of the Macedonians, who were considered by some as barbarians and others as semi-Greek or fully Greek. (Note: Anson 2010, pp. 14–17; this was manifested in the different mythological genealogies concocted for the Macedonian people, with Hesiod's Catalogue of Women claiming that the Macedonians descended from Macedon, son of Zeus and Thyia, and was therefore a nephew of Hellen, progenitor of the Greeks. See: Anson 2010, p. 16; Rhodes 2010, p. 24. By the end of the 5th century BC, Hellanicus of Lesbos asserted Macedon was the son of Aeolus, the latter a son of Hellen and ancestor of the Aeolians, one of the major tribes of the Greeks. As well as belonging to tribal groups such as the Aeolians, Dorians, Achaeans, and Ionians, Anson also stresses the fact that some Greeks even distinguished their ethnic identities based on the polis (i.e. city-state) they originally came from. See: Anson 2010, p. 15.) Roger D. Woodard asserts that in addition to persisting uncertainty in modern times about the proper classification of the Macedonian language and its relation to Greek, ancient authors also presented conflicting ideas about the Macedonians. (Note: For instance, Demosthenes when labeling Philip II of Macedon as a barbarian whereas Polybius called Greeks and Macedonians as homophylos (i.e. part of the same race or kin). See: Woodard 2010, pp. 9–10; Johannes Engels also discusses this ambiguity in ancient sources: Engels 2010, pp. 83–89.) Simon Hornblower argues on the Greek identity of the Macedonians, taking into consideration their origin, language, cults and customs related to ancient Greek traditions. Any preconceived ethnic differences between Greeks and Macedonians faded by 148 BC soon after the Roman conquest of Macedonia and then the rest of Greece with the defeat of the Achaean League by the Roman Republic at the Battle of Corinth (146 BC).

== Technology and engineering ==
=== Architecture ===
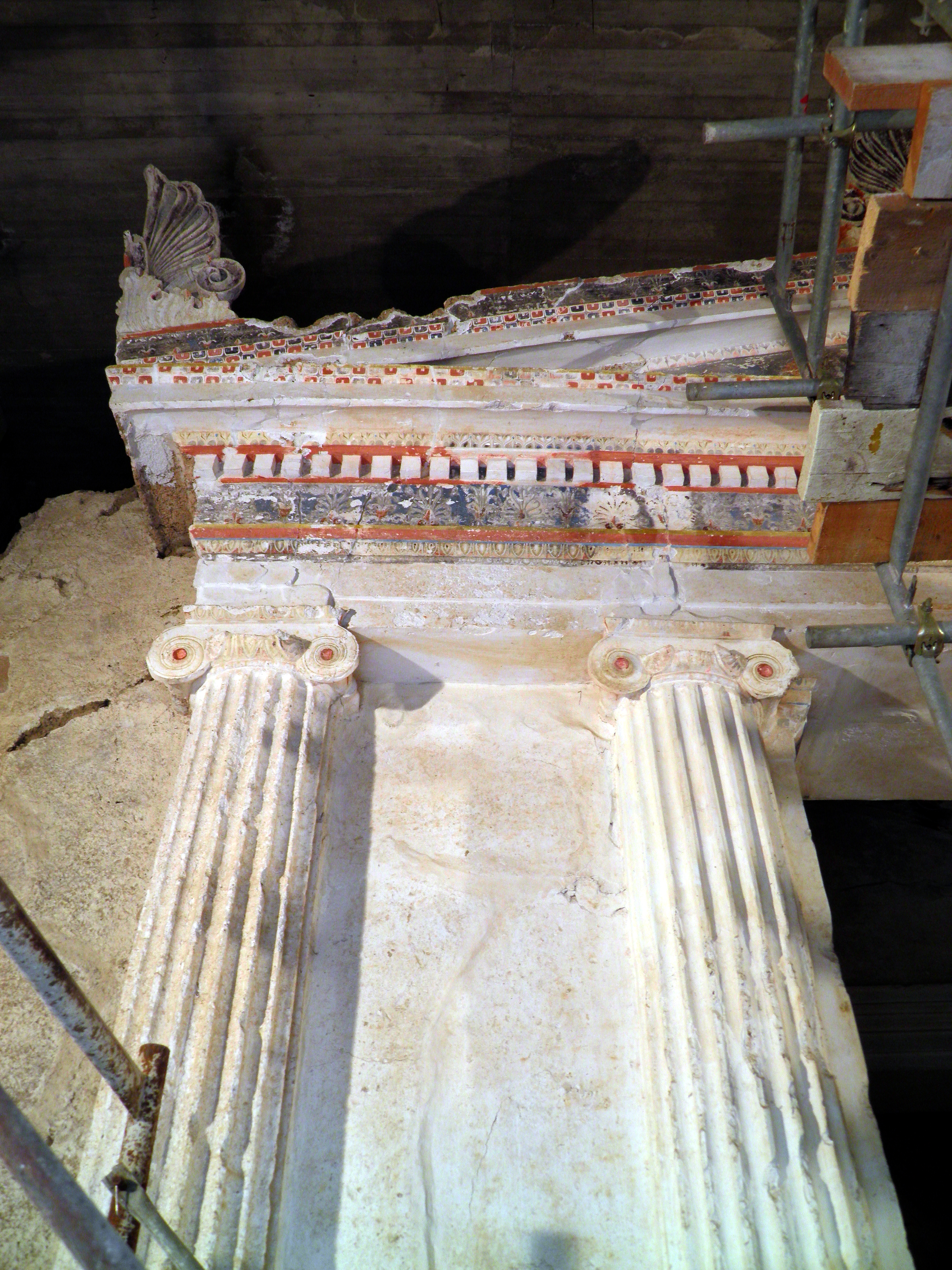
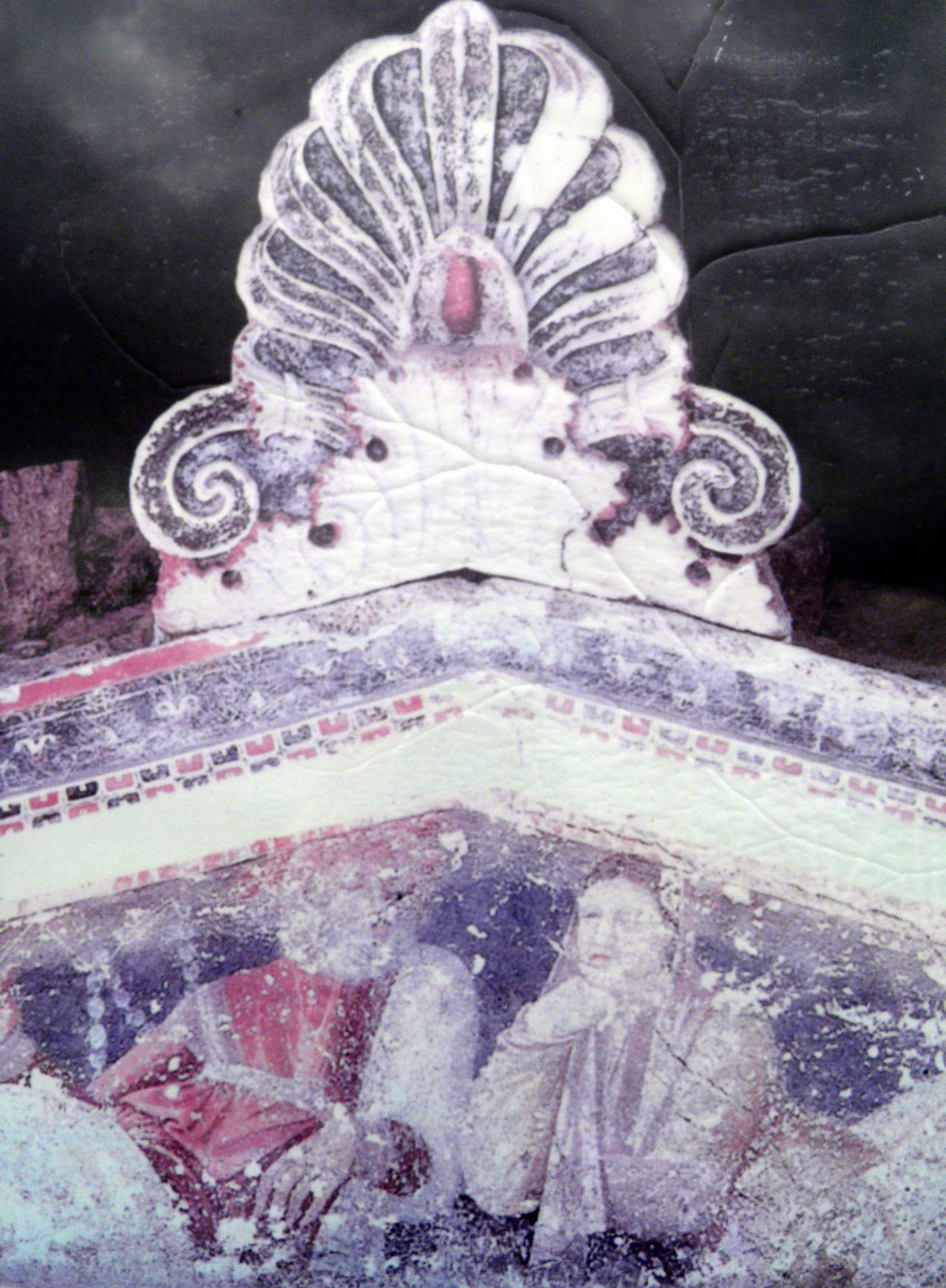
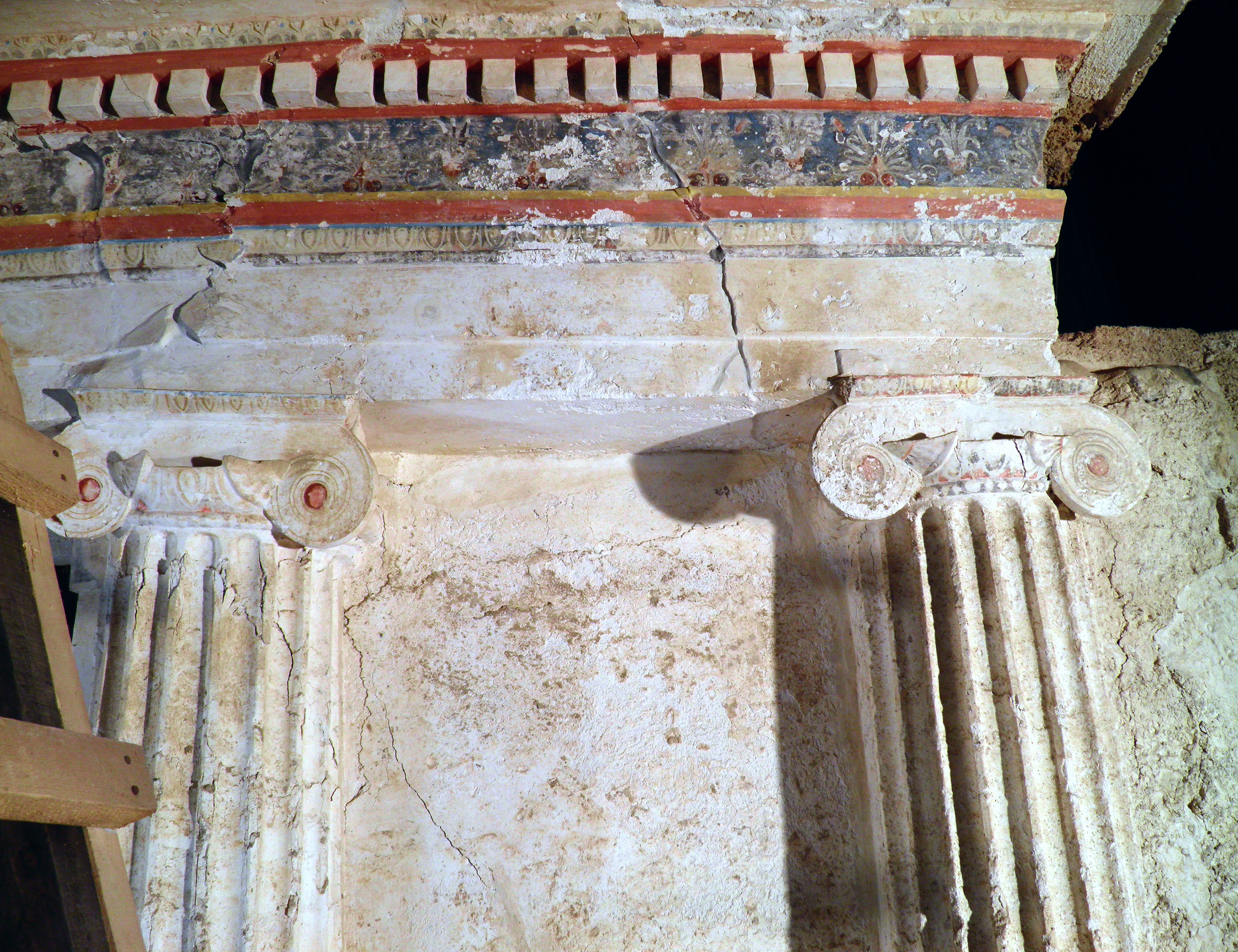
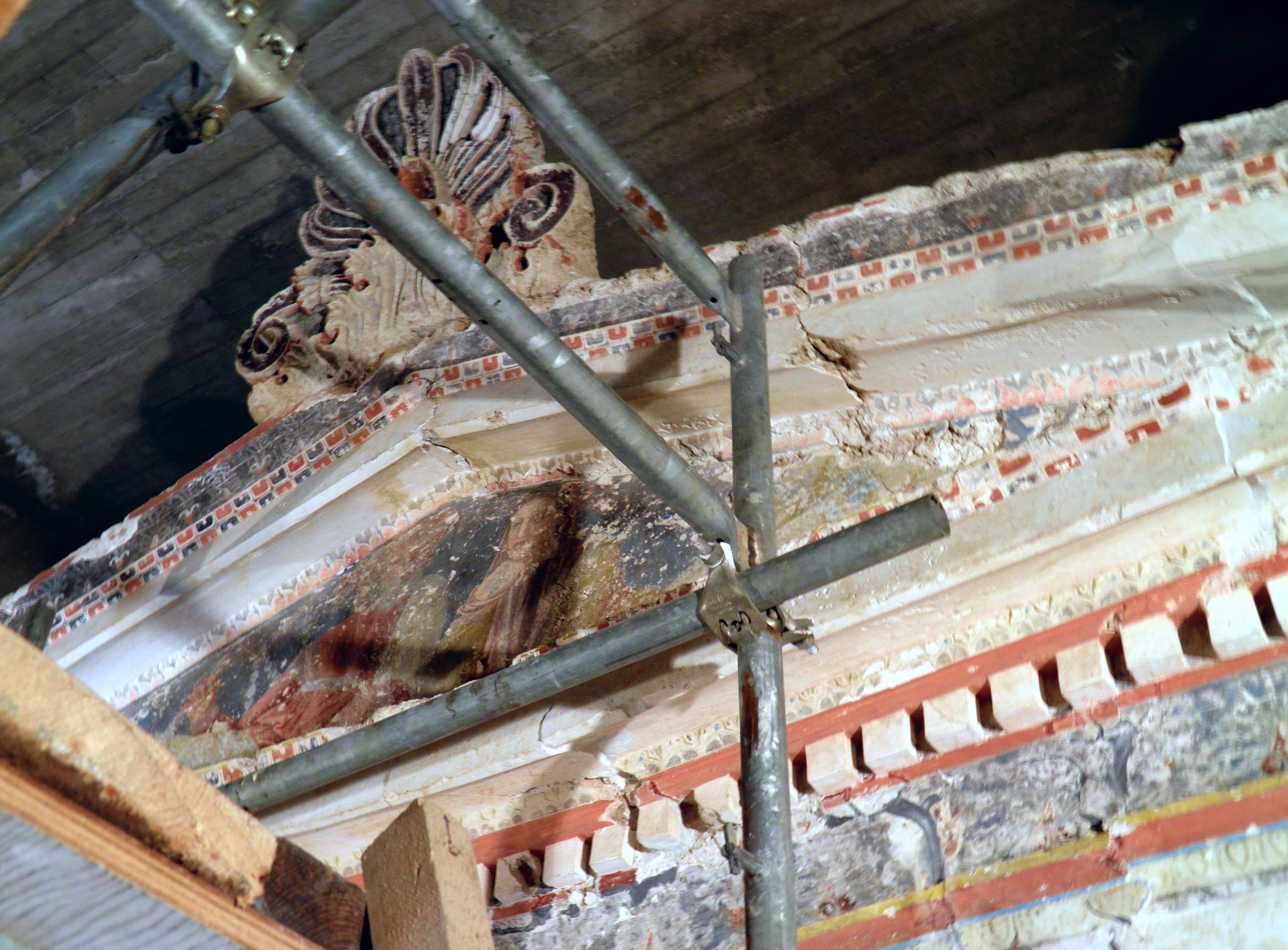
The facade of the Macedonian Tomb of the Palmettes in Mieza, Macedonia, Greece, 3rd century BC; decorated by coloured Doric and Ionic mouldings, the pediment is also painted with a scene of a man and woman reclining together.
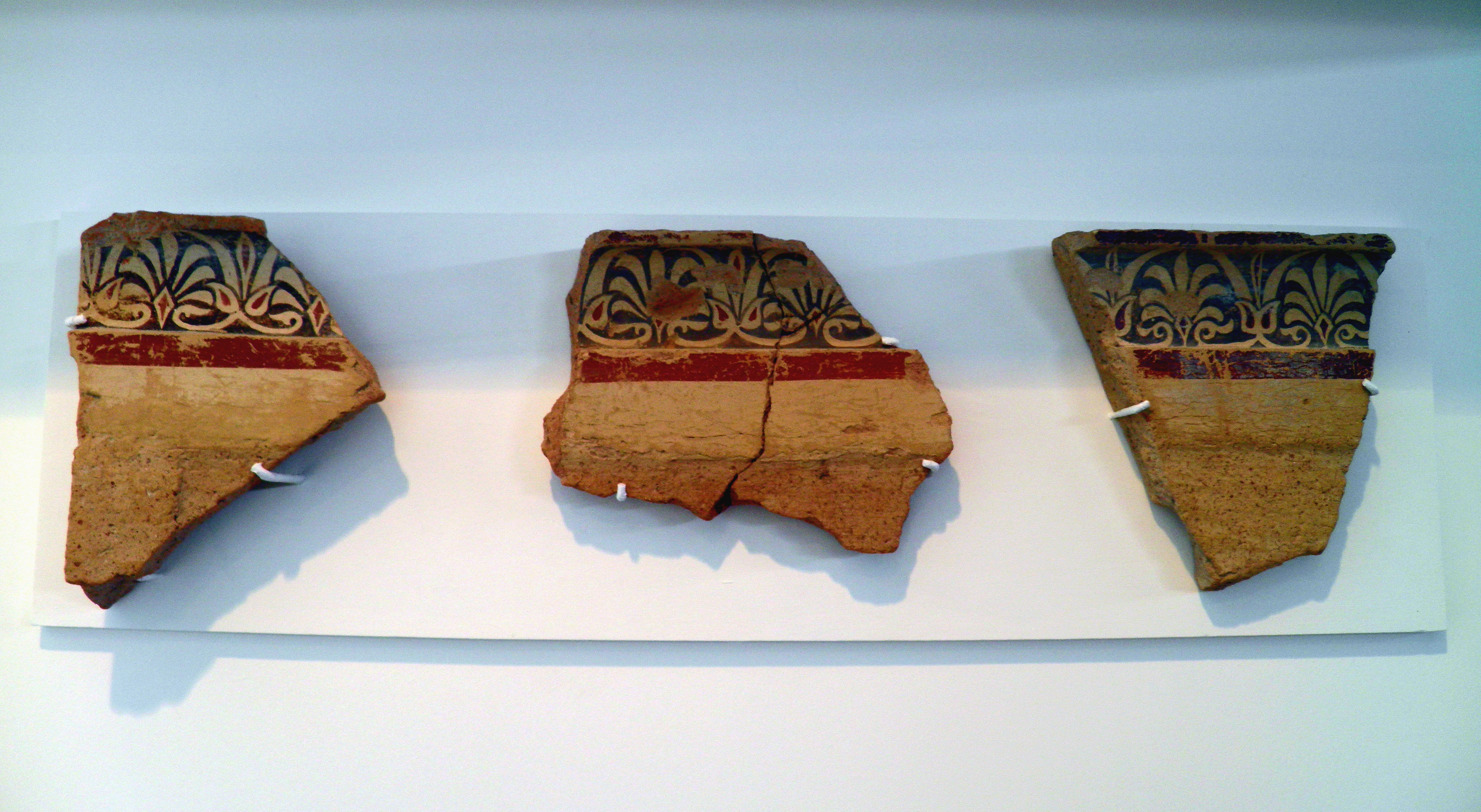
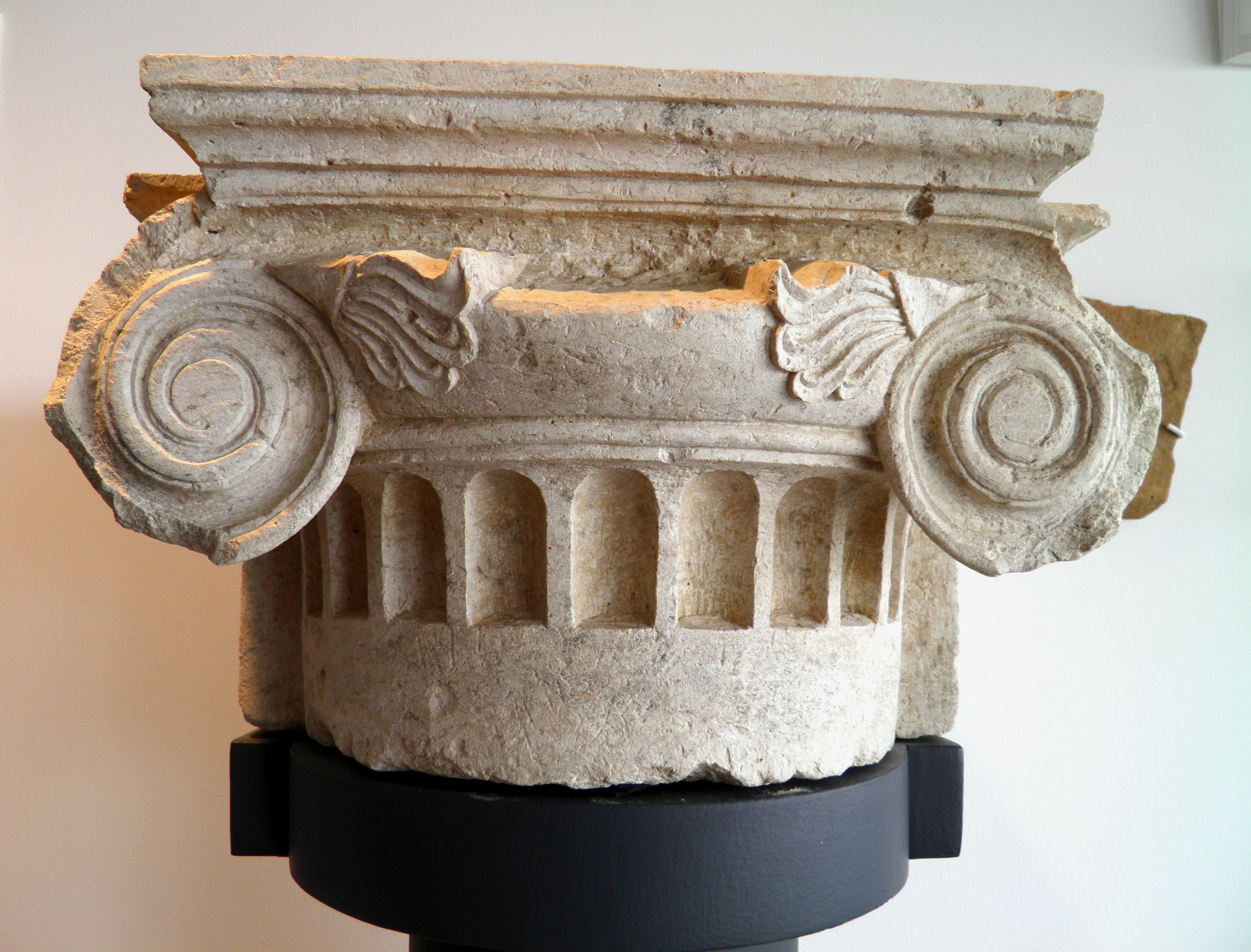
Left, fragments of ancient Macedonian painted roof tiles (raking, simas, pan-tiles), Archaeological Museum of Pella, Greece. Right, the Ionic capital of a pilaster from the palace at Pella, Archaeological Museum of Pella.

Macedonian architecture, although utilizing a mixture of different forms and styles from the rest of Greece, did not represent a unique or diverging style from other ancient Greek architecture. Among the classical orders, Macedonian architects favoured the Ionic order, especially in the peristyle courtyards of private homes. There are several surviving examples, albeit in ruins, of Macedonian palatial architecture, including a palace at the site of the capital Pella, the summer residence of Vergina near the old capital Aigai, and the royal residence at Demetrias near modern Volos. At Vergina, the ruins of three large banquet halls with marble-tiled floors (covered in the debris of roof tiles) with floor plan dimensions measuring roughly 16.7 x 17.6 m (54.8 x 57.7 ft) demonstrate perhaps the earliest examples of monumental triangular roof trusses, if dated before the reign of Antigonus II Gonatas or even the onset of the Hellenistic period. Later Macedonian architecture also featured arches and vaults. The palaces of both Vergina and Demetrias had walls made of sundried bricks, while the latter palace had four corner towers around a central courtyard in the manner of a fortified residence fit for a king or at least a military governor.

Macedonian rulers also sponsored works of architecture outside of Macedonia proper. For instance, following his victory at the Battle of Chaeronea (338 BC), Philip II raised a round memorial building at Olympia known as the Philippeion, decorated inside with statues depicting him, his parents Amyntas III of Macedon and Eurydice I of Macedon, his wife Olympias, and his son Alexander the Great.

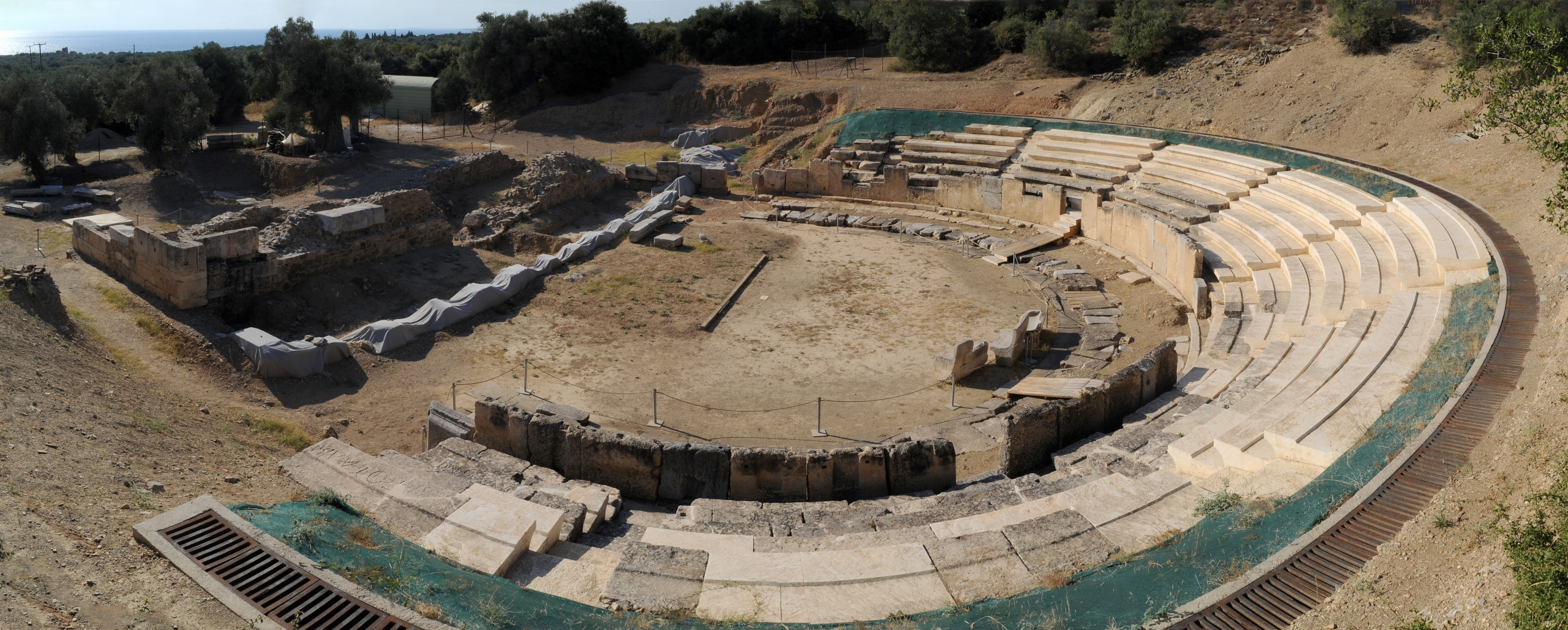
Ruins of the ancient theatre in Maroneia, Rhodope, East Macedonia and Thrace, Greece

The ruins of roughly twenty Greek theatres survive in the present-day regions of Macedonia and Thrace in Greece: sixteen open-air theatres, three odea, and a possible theatre in Veria undergoing excavation.

=== Military technology and engineering ===
By the Hellenistic period, it became common for Greek states to finance the development and proliferation of ever more powerful torsion siege engines, naval ships, and standardized designs for arms and armour. Under Philip II and Alexander the Great, improvements were made to siege artillery such as bolt-shooting ballistae and siege engines such as huge rolling siege towers. E. W. Marsden and M. Y. Treister contend that the Macedonian rulers Antigonus I Monophthalmus and his successor Demetrius I of Macedon had the most powerful siege artillery of the Hellenistic world at the end of the 4th century BC. The siege of Salamis, Cyprus, in 306 BC necessitated the building of large siege engines and drafting of craftsmen from parts of West Asia. The siege tower commissioned by Demetrius I for the Macedonian Siege of Rhodes (305–304 BC) and defended by over three thousand soldiers was built at a height of nine stories. It had a base of 4,300 square feet (399 square metres), eight wheels that were steered in either direction by pivots, three sides covered in iron plates to protect them from fire, and mechanically opened windows (shielded with wool-stuffed leather curtains to soften the blow of ballistae rounds) of different sizes to accommodate the firing of missiles ranging from arrows to larger bolts.

During the siege of Echinus by Philip V of Macedon in 211 BC, the besiegers built tunnels to protect the soldiers and sappers as they went back and forth from the camp to the siege works. These included two siege towers connected by a makeshift wickerwork curtain wall mounted with stone-shooting ballistae, and sheds to protect the approach of the battering ram. Despite the early reputation of Macedon as a leader in siege technology, Alexandria in Ptolemaic Egypt became the centre for technological improvements to the catapult by the 3rd century BC, as evidenced by the writings of Philo of Alexandria.

=== Other innovations ===
Although perhaps not as prolific as other areas of Greece in regards to technological innovations, there are some inventions that may have originated in Macedonia aside from siege engines and artillery. The rotary-operated olive press for producing olive oil may have been invented in ancient Macedonia or another part of Greece, or even as far east as the Levant or Anatolia. Mould-pressed glass first appeared in Macedonia in the 4th century BC (although it could have simultaneously existed in the Achaemenid Empire); the first known clear, translucent glass pieces of the Greek world have been discovered in Macedonia and Rhodes and date to the second half of the 4th century BC. Greek technical and scientific literature began with Classical Athens in the 5th century BC, while the major production centres for technical innovation and texts during the Hellenistic period were Alexandria, Rhodes, and Pergamon.

== Currency, finances, and resources ==
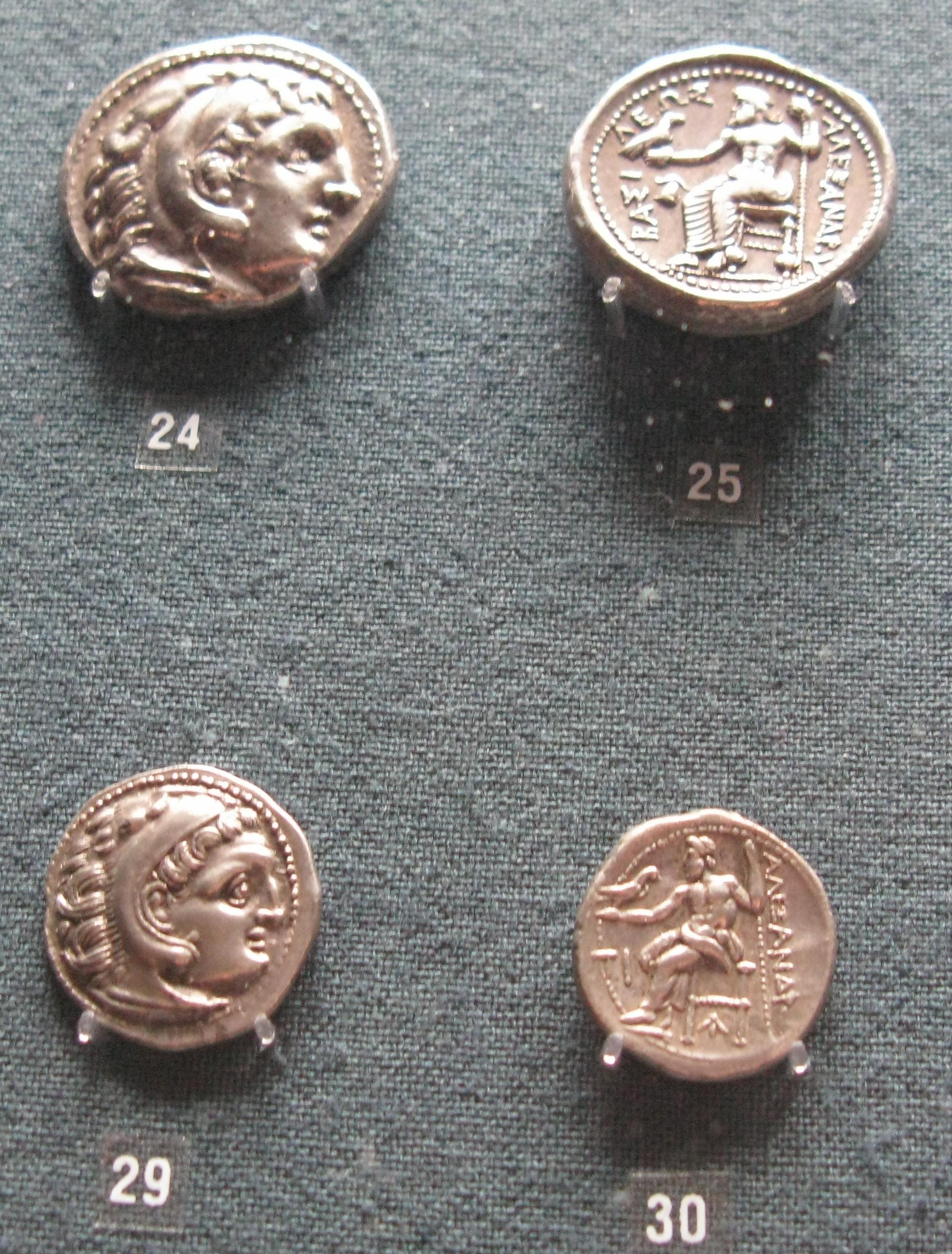
Tetradrachms (above) and drachms (below) issued during the reign of Alexander the Great, now in the Numismatic Museum of Athens

The minting of silver coinage began during the reign of Alexander I as a means to pay for royal expenditures. Archelaus I increased the silver content of his coins as well as minting copper coins to promote foreign and domestic commerce. The minting of coinage significantly increased during the reigns of Philip II and Alexander the Great, especially after the increase in state revenues following the seizure of the Pangaion Hills. During the Hellenistic period the royal houses of Macedonia, Ptolemaic Egypt, and the Attalid kingdom exercised full monopolistic control over mining activities, largely to ensure the funding of their armies. By the end of the conquests of Alexander the Great, nearly thirty mints stretching from Macedonia to Babylon produced standard coins. The right to mint coins was shared by central and some local governments, i.e. the autonomous municipal governments of Thessaloniki, Pella, and Amphipolis within the Macedonian commonwealth. The Macedonians were also the first to issue different coins for internal and external circulation.

State revenues were also raised by collecting produce from arable lands, timber from forests, and taxes on imports and exports at harbours. Some mines, groves, agricultural lands, and forests belonging to the Macedonian state were exploited by the Macedonian king, although these were often leased as assets or given as grants to members of the nobility such as the hetairoi and philoi. Tariffs exacted on goods flowing in and out of Macedonian seaports existed from at least the reign of Amyntas III, and Callistratus of Aphidnae (d. c. 350 BC) aided Perdiccas III in doubling the kingdom's annual profits on customs duties from 20 to 40 talents.

After the defeat of Perseus at Pydna in 168 BC, the Roman Senate allowed the reopening of iron and copper mines, but forbade the mining of gold and silver by the four newly established autonomous client states that replaced the monarchy in Macedonia. The law may originally have been conceived by the Senate due to the fear that material wealth gained from gold and silver mining operations would allow the Macedonians to fund an armed rebellion. The Romans were perhaps also concerned with stemming inflation caused by an increased money supply from Macedonian silver mining. The Macedonians continued minting silver coins between 167 and 148 BC (i.e. just before the establishment of the Roman province of Macedonia), and when the Romans lifted the ban on Macedonian silver mining in 158 BC it may simply have reflected the local reality of this illicit practice continuing regardless of the Senate's decree.

== Legacy ==
The reigns of Philip II and Alexander the Great witnessed the demise of Classical Greece and the birth of Hellenistic civilization, following the spread of Greek culture to the Near East during and after Alexander's conquests. Macedonians then migrated to Egypt and parts of Asia, but the intensive colonization of foreign lands sapped the available manpower in Macedonia proper, weakening the kingdom in its fight with other Hellenistic powers and contributing to its downfall and conquest by the Romans. However, the diffusion of Greek culture and language cemented by Alexander's conquests in West Asia and North Africa served as a "precondition" for the later Roman expansion into these territories and entire basis for the Byzantine Empire, according to Errington.

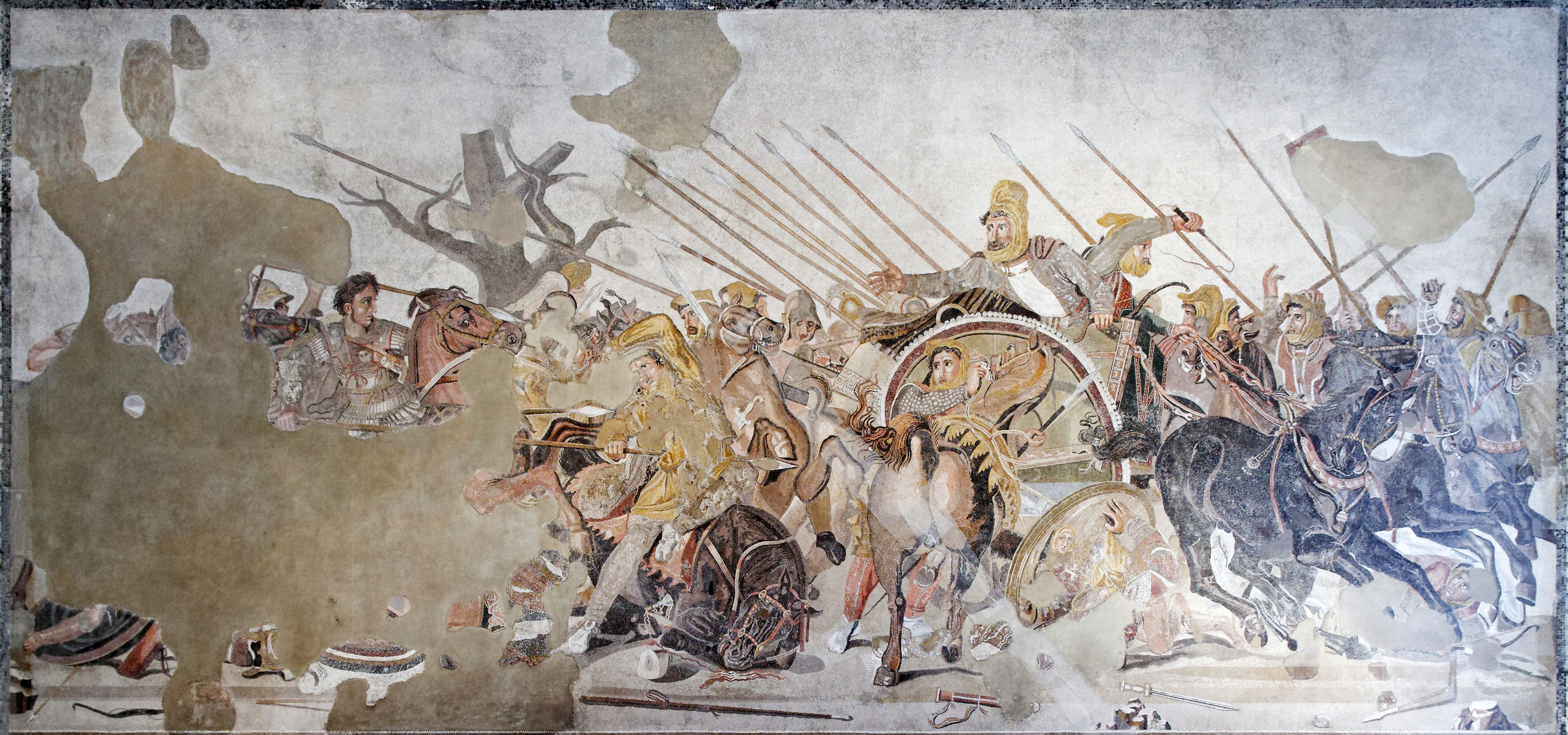
The Alexander Mosaic, a Roman mosaic from Pompeii, Italy, c. 100 BC

The ethnic Macedonian rulers of the Ptolemaic and Seleucid successor states accepted men from all over the Greek world as their hetairoi companions and did not foster a national identity like the Antigonids. Modern scholarship has focused on how these Hellenistic successor kingdoms were influenced more by their Macedonian origins than Eastern or southern Greek traditions. While Spartan society remained mostly insular and Athens continued placing strict limitations on acquiring citizenship, the cosmopolitan Hellenistic cities of Asia and northeastern Africa bore a greater resemblance to Macedonian cities and contained a mixture of subjects including natives, Greek and Macedonian colonists, and Greek-speaking Hellenized Easterners, many of whom were the product of intermarriage between Greeks and native populations.

The deification of Macedonian monarchs perhaps began with the death of Philip II, but it was his son Alexander the Great who unambiguously claimed to be a living god. (Note: Worthington 2012, p. 319. As pharaoh of the Egyptians, he was already titled Son of Ra and considered the living incarnation of Horus by his Egyptian subjects (a belief that the Ptolemaic successors of Alexander would foster for their own dynasty in Egypt). See: Worthington 2014, p. 180 and Sansone 2017, p. 228 for details.) Following his visit to the oracle of Didyma in 334 BC that suggested his divinity, Alexander travelled to the Oracle of Zeus Ammon—the Greek equivalent of the Egyptian Amun-Ra—at the Siwa Oasis of the Libyan Desert in 332 BC to confirm his divine status. (Note: Worthington 2012, p. 319; Worthington 2014, pp. 180–183. After the priest and Oracle of Zeus Ammon at the Siwa Oasis convinced him that Philip II was merely his mortal father and Zeus his actual father, Alexander began styling himself as the 'Son of Zeus', which brought him into contention with some of his Greek subjects who adamantly believed that living men could not be immortals. See Worthington 2012, p. 319 and Worthington 2014, pp. 182–183 for details.) Although the Ptolemaic and Seleucid empires maintained ancestral cults and deified their rulers, kings were not worshipped in the Kingdom of Macedonia. While Zeus Ammon was known to the Greeks prior to Alexander's reign, particularly at the Greek colony of Cyrene, Libya, Alexander was the first Macedonian monarch to patronize Egyptian, Persian, and Babylonian priesthoods and deities, strengthening the fusion of Near Eastern and Greek religious beliefs. After his reign, the cult of Isis gradually spread throughout the Hellenistic and Roman world, while beliefs in the Egyptian god Sarapis were thoroughly Hellenized by the Ptolemaic rulers of Egypt before the spread of his cult to Macedonia and the Aegean region. The German historian Johann Gustav Droysen argued that the conquests of Alexander the Great and creation of the Hellenistic world allowed for the growth and establishment of Christianity in the Roman era.

== See also ==
- Historiography of Alexander the Great
- List of kings of Macedon
- Geographic region of Macedonia
- Macedonia region of Greece
- Tomb of Alexander the Great
- Museum of the Royal Tombs of Aigai (Vergina)
