= Derbe (disambiguation) =

Derbe may refer to:

- Derbe, a city in ancient Galatia
- Derbe (Diocese), a former bishopric located at Derbe
- Derbe (river), a river in the Russian Far East
