= Acts of Timothy =

New Testament apocrypha

The Acts of Timothy (Acta Timothei) are a work of New Testament apocrypha, most likely from the 5th century, which are primarily concerned with portraying the apostle Timothy as the first bishop of Ephesus and describing his death during a violent pagan festival in the same town.

== History ==
For many years these Acts were known only through a Latin translation (BHL 8294) included in the second volume of the Acta Sanctorum in 1643. Photius, the learned patriarch of Constantinople, had read the Greek original and had given an account in his Bibliotheca (Codex 254). Then in 1877 Hermann Usener edited the Greek original (BHG 1847), which had been located in Paris Codex Gr. 1219 (from the 11th or 12th century).

The Latin version attributes the Acts to Polycrates of Ephesus (c. 130–196); however, the Greek original has no such attestation, thus indicating that such an ascription of authorship was a later addition. Usener dated the Acts before 356, probably between 320 and 340, and thought they were based on a veritable history of the Ephesian church. Shortly after its publication Theodor Zahn raised several issues concerning Usener's dating. One problem was the statement in the Acts that Lystra was in the province (eparchy) of Lycaonia. Zahn pointed out that Lycaonia was not a separate province until after c. 370. Accordingly, most scholars put the time of composition no earlier than the fifth century. Another more recently observed problem is the two named proconsuls of Asia, Maximus and Peregrinus. Both these individuals have been judged fictitious by Ronald Syme. Thus, the trustworthiness of the Acts as a source for historical information is somewhat impaired. Nevertheless, the author does display local knowledge of the topography and culture of Ephesus.

== Content ==
The Acts tell how Paul had consecrated Timothy as bishop during Nero's reign on the occasion of a visit to Ephesus which they made together. Then, under Nerva, Timothy suffers a martyr's death during a pagan festival. In this "devilish and abominable festival," as Photius calls it men with masks on their faces and with clubs in their hands went about "assaulting without restraint free men and respectable women, perpetrating murders of no common sort and shedding endless blood in the best parts of the city, as if they were performing a religious duty." Scholars have identified this festival, called katagogia (roughly, "the bringing down"), with the cult of Dionysus. As Klauck describes it, Timothy "attempts to put an end to the wild and violent goings-on but himself falls victim to the orgies."

In addition to the activities of Timothy, there is almost as much material about John the Evangelist, who was also a resident of Ephesus. Usener explains this odd situation as being due perhaps to the material having come originally from an earlier history of the Ephesian church. The Acts also contain an interesting passage on the formation of the fourfold gospel.

Some followers of the disciples of the Lord, not knowing how to put in order certain papyri which were written in different languages and put together in random fashion by these disciples and which dealt with the miracles of the Lord Jesus which had taken place in their time, came to the city of Ephesus and by common consent brought them (the papyri) to John the renowned theologian. He examined them thoroughly and taking his cue from them, after he had put in order the three gospel narratives and entitled them Gospel of Matthew, Gospel of Mark, Gospel of Luke, assigning their proper titles to the gospels, he himself theologized upon the things they had not narrated ..., filling up also the gaps they had left, in their accounts of the miracles especially, and then he set his own name to this compilation or gospel.

— Acts of Timothy

Whereas Lipsius had seen this account as a dressing-up of what was in Eusebius (hist. eccl. III 24, 7), Crehan views it as evidence for an earlier date for the Acts. He argues that Lipsius "does not attach due importance to the circumstantial account in the Acta of the papyri and of their titling by John, an account which it would have been difficult for a forger in the days of the big vellum codices (after 320) to make up for himself."
