= 317 BC =

317 BC in various calendars
- Gregorian calendar: 317 BC; CCCXVII BC
- Ab urbe condita: 437
- Ancient Egypt era: XXXIII dynasty, 7
- Pharaoh: Ptolemy I Soter, 7
- Ancient Greek Olympiad (summer): 115th Olympiad, year 4
- Assyrian calendar: 4434
- Balinese saka calendar: N/A
- Bengali calendar: −910 – −909
- Berber calendar: 634
- Buddhist calendar: 228
- Burmese calendar: −954
- Byzantine calendar: 5192–5193
- Chinese calendar: 癸卯年 (Water Rabbit); 2381 or 2174 — to — 甲辰年 (Wood Dragon); 2382 or 2175
- Coptic calendar: −600 – −599
- Discordian calendar: 850
- Ethiopian calendar: −324 – −323
- Hebrew calendar: 3444–3445
- Hindu calendars
- Vikram Samvat: −260 – −259
- Shaka Samvat: N/A
- Kali Yuga: 2784–2785
- Holocene calendar: 9684
- Iranian calendar: 938 BP – 937 BP
- Islamic calendar: 967 BH – 966 BH
- Javanese calendar: N/A
- Julian calendar: N/A
- Korean calendar: 2017
- Minguo calendar: 2228 before ROC 民前2228年
- Nanakshahi calendar: −1784
- Thai solar calendar: 226–227
- Tibetan calendar: ཆུ་མོ་ཡོས་ལོ་ (female Water-Hare) −190 or −571 or −1343 — to — ཤིང་ཕོ་འབྲུག་ལོ་ (male Wood-Dragon) −189 or −570 or −1342

Year 317 BC was a year of the pre-Julian Roman calendar. At the time, it was known as the Year of the Consulship of Brutus and Barbula (or, less frequently, year 437 Ab urbe condita). The denomination 317 BC for this year has been used since the early medieval period, when the Anno Domini calendar era became the prevalent method in Europe for naming years.

== Events ==
=== By place ===
==== Macedonian Empire ====
- Battle of Byzantium: At the start of the year, Antigonus Monophthalmus sends Nicanor with a large fleet to do battle with Cleitus the White at the Hellespont. The two fleets meet in near Byzantium, Cleitus wins a victory in which some 70 ships of Nicanor are captured, sunk or disabled, the remnant escaping to Chalcedon, where they are joined by Antigonus and his army. Antigonus orders the remaining 60 ships to be readied for renewed action, and assigns his strongest and most loyal soldiers as marines to these ships. Meanwhile, the Byzantines transport his archers, slingers and peltast to the European shore, where Cleitus's victorious forces were encamped. At dawn the next day Antigonus launches an assault by land and sea and catches Cleitus completely by surprise; Cleitus’s entire force is captured or killed.
- Seleucus joins Antigonus against Eumenes and recaptures Babylon.
- Battle of Paraitacene: The first battle of Western armies each with an elephant corps who fight for control over Alexander's empire. The armies of Antigonus and Eumenes fight each other near today's Isfahan in Persia with no clear victor.
- Armenia's Persian satrap, Ardvates, frees his country from Macedonian control.
- After capturing Athens from Macedonia's regent Polyperchon, Cassander entrusts the government of Athens to the Athenian orator, statesman, and philosopher, Demetrius Phalereus.
- Polyperchon flees to Epirus, where he joins Alexander the Great's mother Olympias, Alexander's widow Roxana, and Alexander's infant son Alexander IV. He forms an alliance with Olympias, who is acting as regent for Alexander IV, and King Aeacides of Epirus.
- While Cassander is occupied in the Peloponnesus, Olympias leads an army into Macedonia. She is initially successful, defeating the army of King Philip III Arrhidaeus and capturing King Philip and his wife, Eurydice, as well as Cassander's brother, Nicanor. She then has them murdered.
- Ptolemy marries Berenice, lady-in-waiting to his first wife Eurydice.

==== Sicily ====
- Acestorides, a native of Corinth, is made supreme commander by the citizens of Syracuse.
- After twice being banished for attempting to overthrow the oligarchical party, Agathocles returns with an army and banishes or murders about 10,000 citizens (including the oligarchs), and sets himself up as tyrant of Syracuse. Acestorides is banished from the city.

=== By topic ===
==== Art ====
- Private funeral monuments are banned in Athenian cemeteries.

==== Literature ====
- Menander wins the first prize at the Lenaian festival with his play Dyskolos (The Grouch).

== Deaths ==
- King Philip III of Macedon (b. c. 359 BC)
- Queen Eurydice III of Macedon
- Nicanor Macedonian officer of Cassander and the son in law of Aristotle.
- Cleitus the White
