= Eunice (biblical figure) =

Mother of Timothy

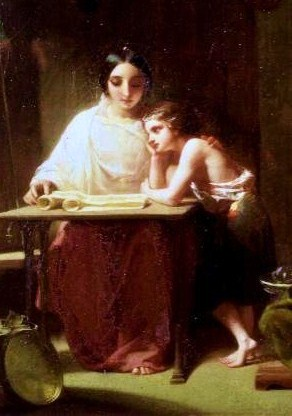
Depiction of Eunice and Timothy by Henry Lejeune.

According to the New Testament, Eunice was the mother of Timothy and influenced his faith in Christ. Born into the Jewish faith, she and her mother Lois accepted Christianity.

Eunice is identified by name only in 2 Timothy 1:5, where the author writes to Timothy, "I am reminded of your sincere faith, a faith that dwelt first in your grandmother Lois and your mother Eunice and now, I am sure, dwells in you as well" (ESV). Many commentators have also connected Eunice to 2 Timothy 3:15, where Timothy is reminded, "from childhood you have been acquainted with the sacred writings" (ESV). Albert Barnes makes this observation of Eunice: "The mother of Timothy was a pious Hebrewess, and regarded it as one of the duties of her religion to train her son in the careful knowledge of the word of God." Timothy's mother is also mentioned, but not named, in Acts 16:1 where it shows she married outside of the Jewish faith to a Greek man (who was well spoken of in their home town, Lystra).
