= Perilaus (son of Antipater) =

Macedonian nobleman (4th century BC)

Perilaus (Ancient Greek: Περίλαος; fl. late 4th century BC) was a Macedonian nobleman, son of Antipater, regent of Macedon, and younger brother of Cassander. He appears to have remained in Pella with his father during Alexander's campaigns. Plutarch records that Perilaus assigned himself to the management of his brother Cassander's military and domestic affairs.

He may have established a dynasty in Derbe at the close of the fourth century BC and be an ancestor of Antipater of Derbe.
