= Tamina (disambiguation) =

Tamina is an American professional wrestler.

Tamina may also refer to:

- Tamina (dessert), an Algerian sweet
- Tamina dialect, part of the Okinoerabu dialect cluster in Japan
- Tamina (river), a river in Switzerland
- Tamina, Texas, an unincorporated community in Texas

== See also ==
- Tamynae, a town of ancient Euboea
