= Antipater of Derbe =

Antipater

Tyrant of Derbe and Laranda
- Reign: c.50-30 BC
- Successor: Amyntas of Galatia
- Died: c.30 BC
- Issue: Unamed sons
- House: Antipatrid dynasty?
- Father: Perilaus

Antipater of Derbe (Ancient Greek: Ἀντίπατρος; fl. c. 51–36 BC) was a dynast of southern Lycaonia who controlled the cities of Derbe and Laranda in the borderlands of the central Anatolian plateau and the Taurus Mountains. He is attested in the letters of his friend Cicero and in Strabo's Geographica.

== Biography ==
Derbe lay astride the principal overland road connecting the interior of Asia Minor to Syria and the Cilician Gates, the main pass through the Taurus, while Laranda served as the starting-point of several routes descending into Cilicia Tracheia toward Seleucia ad Calycadnum and the sea. Cicero, travelling south through Lycaonia in September 51 BC by way of Lystra, Derbe, and Laranda, is thought to have met and been entertained by Antipater at this time, the occasion from which their friendship arose.

Strabo characterizes Antipater as holding a tyranneion in the northern borderland of the Taurus and classes him among brigands, a label Syme contextualized by comparison with other late Republican dynasts, resourceful men who held power in geographically inaccessible regions during times of disorder and were tolerated or even enlisted by Rome as agents of local order. Syme conjectured that Antipater owed the formal legitimacy of his principality, if not its origins, to Pompey, and that during the civil war years 49–47 BC he supported the Pompeian cause. One of Cicero's letters is addressed on Antipater's behalf to Quintus Philippus, the proconsul of Cilicia, who had taken Antipater's sons hostage.

Antipater was ultimately attacked and killed by Amyntas of Galatia, at some point after 36 BC, probably after the Battle of Actium.

== Family ==
As attested in an inscription from Temenothyra, Antipater's father bore the name Perilaus (Περίλαος), a distinctively Macedonian name. The pairing of the names Perilaus and Antipater recalls a much earlier Antipater, the regent of Macedon after the death of Alexander the Great (323–319 BC), who had a son called Perilaus. Robert proposed that the names alternated across generations in the patronymic manner common to Macedonian settler families in Asia Minor, such as the Lysias and Philomelos attested elsewhere.

Mitchell pressed the genealogy further, suggesting that the founding Perilaus may have been a younger son of the regent himself, which would place the origin of the dynasty at the close of the fourth century BC and make Antipater of Derbe a descendant of one of the most powerful Macedonian families of the early Hellenistic period.
