= Archestratus (boule) =

Archestratus (Ancient Greek: Ἀρχέστρατος) was a member of the boule (βολή) at Athens, who during the siege of the city after the Battle of Aegospotami in 405 BCE, was thrown into prison for advising capitulation on the terms required by the Spartans.

There was also an "Archestratus" who was the mover of the decree passed by the Athenians at the instigation of Agnonides, that an embassy should be sent to the Macedonian king Philip III of Macedon, and the regent Polyperchon, to accuse Phocion of treason in 318. The German classicist Johann Gottlob Theaenus Schneider identified this Archestratus with the one mentioned immediately above, though other scholars disagree that these two were the same person.
