= Hagnon of Tarsus =

Ancient Greek rhetorician and philosopher

Hagnon of Tarsus (Ancient Greek: Ἅγνων, 2nd century BC) was an ancient Greek rhetorician, an Academic Skeptic philosopher, and a pupil of Carneades. Quintilian chides him for writing a book called Rhetorices accusatio (Prosecution of Rhetoric) in which he denied that rhetoric was an art.

Athenaeus cites him for a curious piece of information that "among the Spartans it is custom for girls before their marriage to be treated like favorite boys (paidikois)" (i.e. sexually). Plutarch quotes him as the source of a story concerning an elephant which was being cheated of its food by its keeper:

Hagnon tells a story of an elephant in Syria, that was bred up in a certain house, who observed that his keeper took away and defrauded him every day of half the measure of his barley; only that once, the master being present and looking on, the keeper poured out the whole measure; which was no sooner done, but the elephant, extending his proboscis, separated the barley and divided it into two equal parts, thereby ingeniously discovering, as much as in him lay, the injustice of his keeper.

Hagnon is also mentioned by Cicero.

Some modern scholars have considered this Hagnon to be the same man as the demagogue Agnonides, the contemporary of Phocion, as the latter is in some manuscripts of Cornelius Nepos called "Agnon." But the manner in which Agnon is mentioned by Quintilian shows that he is a rhetorician, who lived at a much later period than the 4th century BC suggested by an identification with Agnonides. Whether he is the same as the Academic philosopher mentioned by Athenaeus is still a matter of some debate.
