= Saint Timothy =

1st-century Christian evangelist, philosopher and bishop

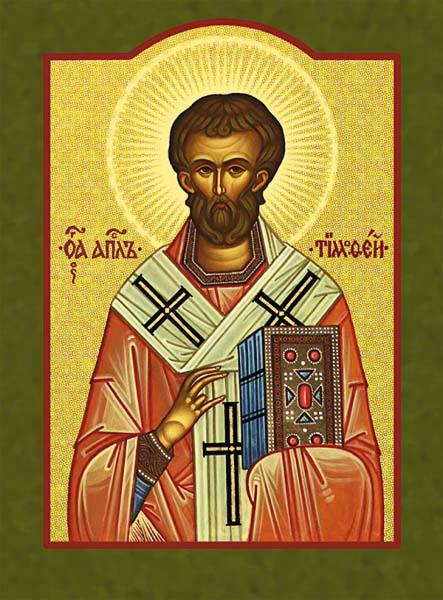
- Icon of Saint Timothy

Bishop, Martyr
- Born: c. AD 17; Lystra, Galatia, Roman Empire or Derbe, Galatia, Roman Empire
- Died: unknown (The Acts of Timothy dates Timothy's death to c. AD 97 [aged 79/80]); Ephesus, Asia, Roman Empire
- Venerated in: Catholic Church; Eastern Orthodox Church; Oriental Orthodoxy; Anglicanism; Lutheranism
- Feast: January 22 (Eastern Christianity); January 26 (Catholic Church, Lutheranism, Anglican Communion); January 24 (some local calendars and pre-1970 General Roman Calendar); 23 Tobi (Coptic Christianity); 27 Tobi (Relocation of Relics – Coptic Christianity); Thursday after fifth Sunday after feast of the Holy Cross (Armenian Apostolic Church)
- Attributes: pastoral staff
- Patronage: Invoked against stomach and intestinal disorders

Timothy (Greek: Τιμόθεος, Timótheos, meaning "honouring God" or "honoured by God") was an early Christian evangelist and the first Bishop of Ephesus, whom the Acts of Timothy relates died around AD 97.

Timothy was from the Lycaonian city of Lystra or of Derbe in Asia Minor, born of a Jewish mother who had become a Christian believer, and a Greek father. The Apostle Paul met him during his second missionary journey and he became Paul's companion and missionary partner along with Silas. The New Testament indicates that Timothy traveled with Paul the Apostle, who was also his mentor. He is addressed as the recipient of the First and Second Epistles to Timothy in the New Testament.

== Life ==
Timothy was a native of Lystra or of Derbe in Lycaonia (Asia Minor). When Paul and Barnabas first visited Lystra, Paul healed a person crippled from birth, leading many of the inhabitants to accept his teaching. When he returned a few years later with Silas, Timothy was already a respected member of the Christian congregation, as were his grandmother Lois and his mother Eunice, both Jews. In 2 Timothy 1:5, his mother and grandmother are noted as eminent for their piety and faith. Timothy is said to have been acquainted with the Scriptures since childhood. In 1 Corinthians 16:10, there is a suggestion that he was by nature reserved and timid: "When Timothy comes, see that you put him at ease among you, for he is doing the work of the Lord".

Timothy's father was a Greek Gentile. Thus Timothy had not been circumcised and Paul now ensured that this was done, according to Acts 16:1-3, to ensure Timothy's acceptability to the Jews whom they would be evangelizing. According to John William McGarvey: “Yet we see him in the case before us, circumcising Timothy with his own hand, and this ‘on account of certain Jews who were in those quarters.’” This did not compromise the decision made at the Council of Jerusalem, that gentile believers were not required to be circumcised.

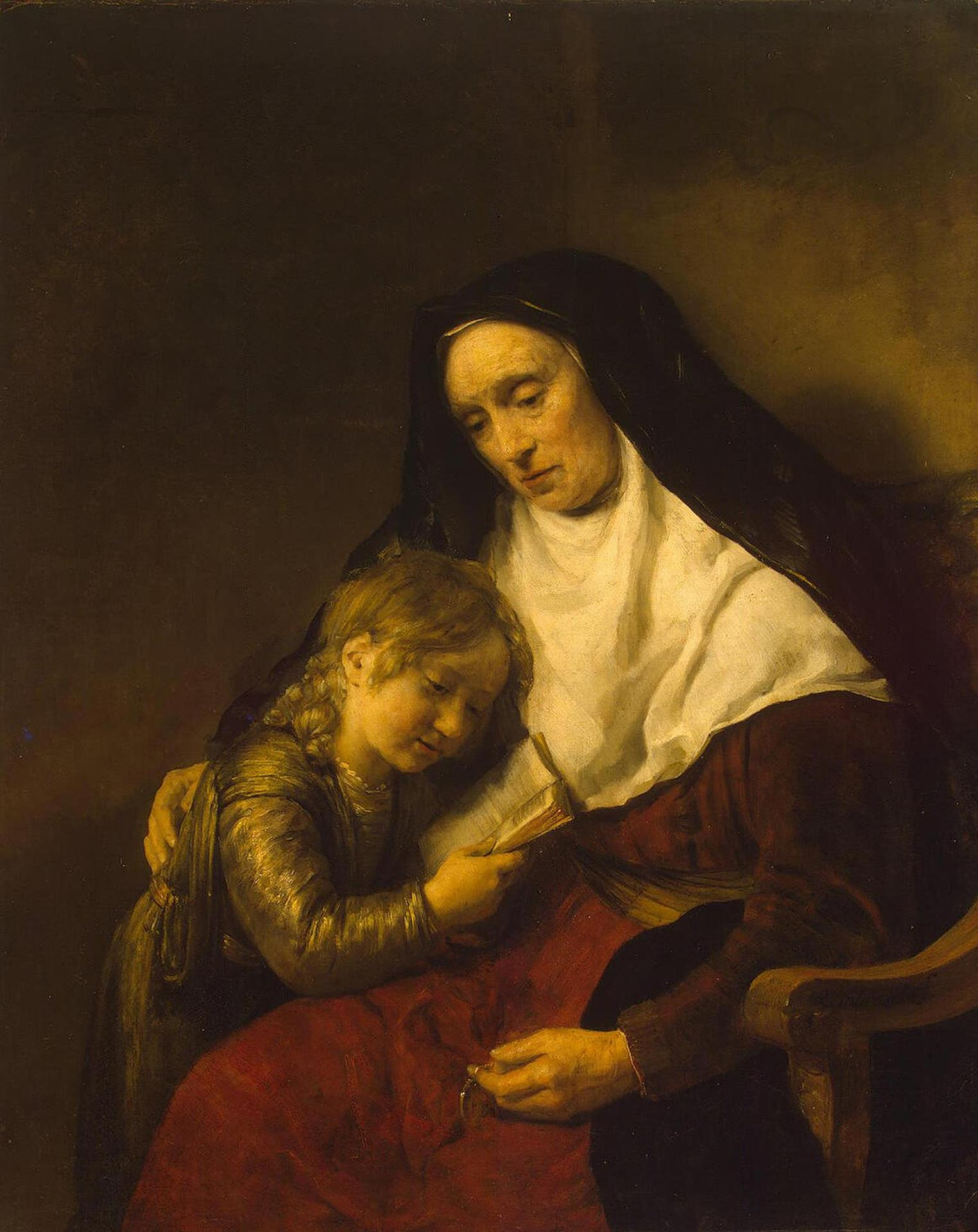
Rembrandt's Timothy and his grandmother, 1648

== Ministry ==
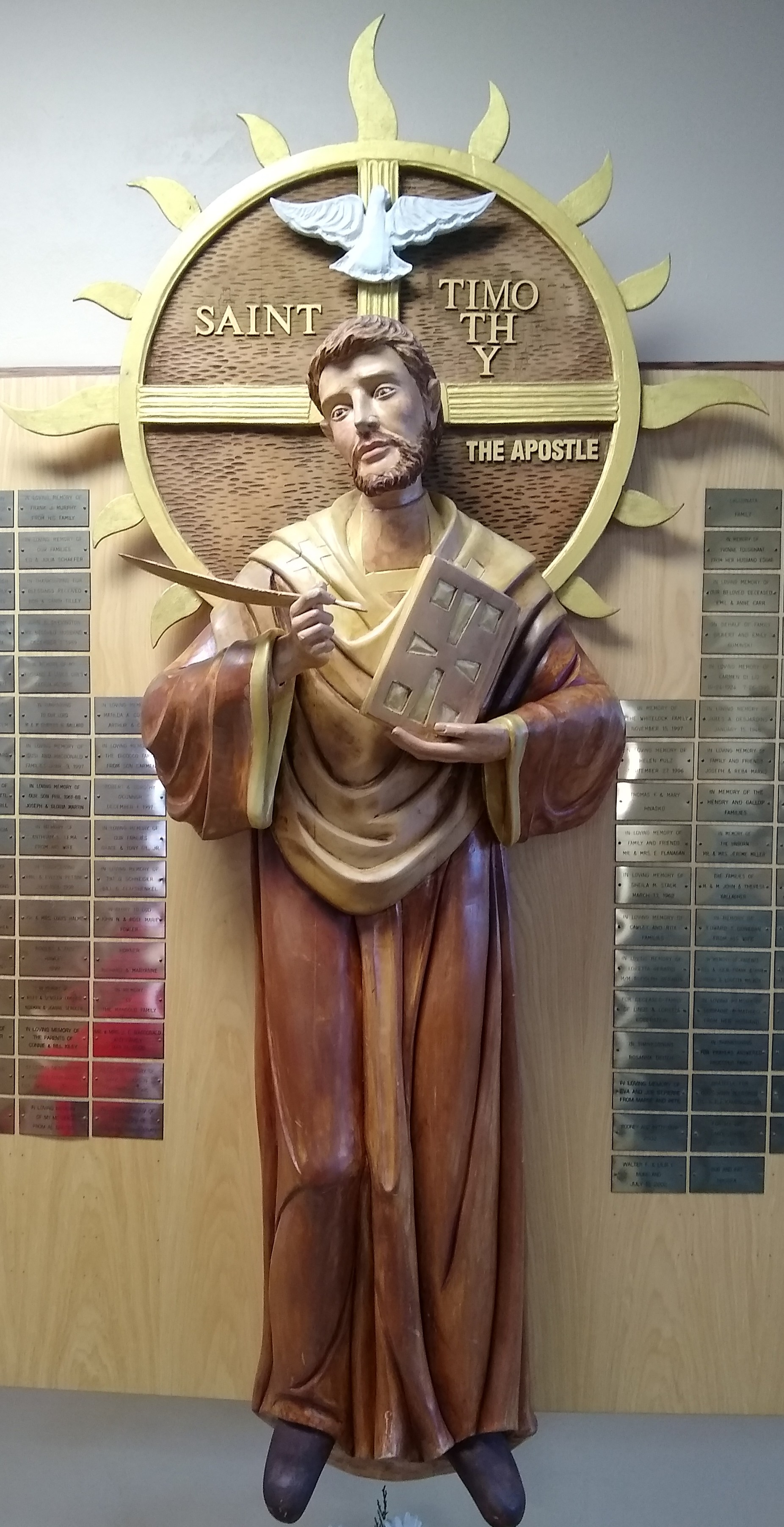
Statue of Saint Timothy at Saint Timothy's Church in The Villages, Florida

Timothy became Paul's disciple, and later his constant companion and co-worker in preaching. In AD 52, Paul and Silas took Timothy along with them on their journey to Macedonia. Augustine extols his zeal and disinterestedness in immediately forsaking his country, his house, and his parents, to follow the apostle, to share in his poverty and sufferings. Timothy may have been subject to ill health or "frequent ailments", and Paul encouraged him to "use a little wine for your stomach's sake".

When Paul went on to Athens, Silas and Timothy stayed for some time at Beroea and Thessalonica before joining Paul at Corinth. 1 Thessalonians 3:1–6 suggests that from Corinth, Paul sent Timothy back to Thessalonika to enquire about the community's continued faith, reporting back that it was in good shape. Timothy next appears in Acts during Paul's stay in Ephesus (54–57), and in late AD 56 or early 57 Paul sent him forth to Macedonia with the aim that he would eventually arrive at Corinth. Timothy arrived at Corinth just after Paul's letter 1 Corinthians reached that city.

Timothy was with Paul in Corinth during the winter of 57–58 when Paul dispatched his Letter to the Romans. According to Acts 20:3–6, Timothy was with Paul in Macedonia just before Passover in AD 58; he left the city before Paul, going ahead of him to await Paul in Troas. "That is the last mention of Timothy in Acts", Raymond Brown notes. In AD 64, Paul left Timothy at Ephesus, to govern that church.

His relationship with Paul was close. Timothy's name appears as the co-author on 2 Corinthians, Philippians, Colossians, 1 Thessalonians, 2 Thessalonians, and Philemon. Paul wrote to the Philippians about Timothy, "I have no one like him." When Paul was in prison and awaiting martyrdom, he summoned his faithful friend Timothy for a last farewell.

That Timothy was jailed at least once during the period of the writing of the New Testament is implied by the writer of Hebrews mentioning Timothy's release at the end of the epistle.

Although not stated in the New Testament, other sources have records of the apostle's death. The apocryphal Acts of Timothy states that in AD 97, the 80-year-old bishop tried to halt a procession in honor of the goddess Diana by preaching the Gospel. The angry pagans beat him, dragged him through the streets, and stoned him to death.

== Veneration ==
Timothy is venerated as an apostle, saint, and martyr by the Eastern Orthodox Church, with his feast day on 22 January. The General Roman Calendar venerates Timothy together with Titus by a memorial on 26 January, the day after the Feast of the Conversion of Saint Paul. From the 13th century until 1969 the feast of Timothy (alone) was on 24 January, the day before that of the Conversion of Saint Paul. Along with Titus and Silas, Timothy is commemorated by the Evangelical Lutheran Church in America on 26 January. Timothy's feast is kept by the Lutheran Church–Missouri Synod on 24 January.

Timothy is honored on the calendars of the Church of England and the Episcopal Church (with Titus) on 26 January.

In the 4th century, the relics of Timothy were transferred from Ephesus to Constantinople and placed in the Church of the Holy Apostles near the tombs of Andrew and Luke. In the 13th century, the relics seem to have been taken to Italy by a count returning from the crusades, and buried around 1239 in the Termoli Cathedral. The remains were rediscovered in 1945, during restoration work.

=== Patronage ===
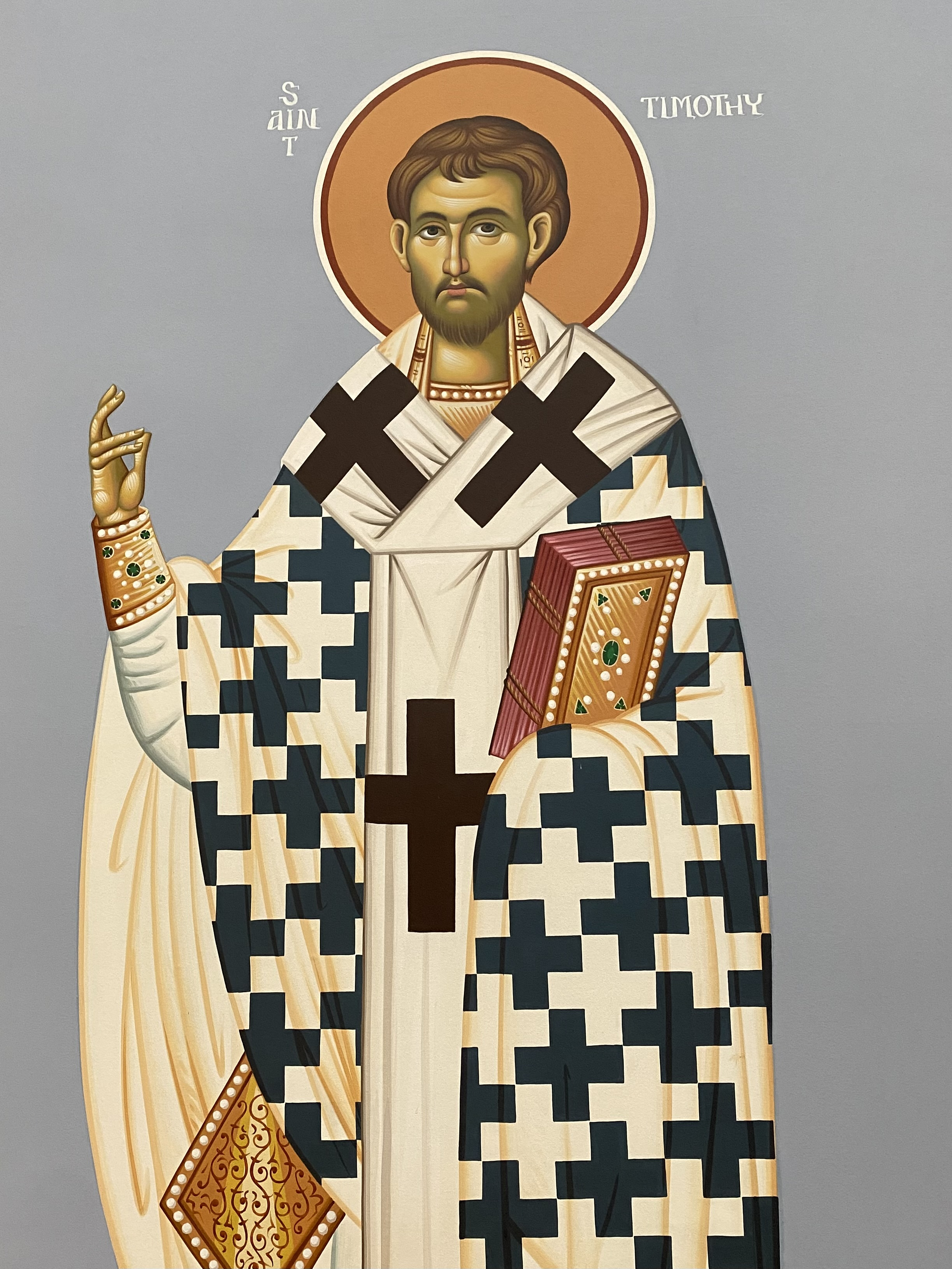
Icon of Saint Timothy in an Orthodox parish in the United States

Timothy is invoked against stomach and intestinal disorders.

== Pastoral Epistles ==
There are two letters to Timothy attributed to Paul the Apostle, the First Epistle to Timothy and the Second Epistle to Timothy. These – along with the Epistle to Titus – are called the Pastoral Epistles, and are considered pseudepigraphic by some modern scholars, including Bart Ehrman, Raymond Collins, and David E. Aune.

=== First Timothy (c. 62–64) ===
The author of this epistle writes to Timothy concerning the organization of the church and Timothy's own leadership within the body. Major themes include the use of The Law, warnings against false doctrine such as Encratism, instructions for prayer, roles of women in the church, qualifications for leaders of the church, and the treatment of widows, elders, masters, youth, and church members in general.

=== Second Timothy (c. 62–64) ===
According to the letter, Paul urges Timothy not to have a "spirit of timidity" and not to "be ashamed to testify about our Lord". He also entreats Timothy to come to him before winter, and to bring Mark with him. Paul clearly anticipates his being put to death and realities beyond in his valedictory found in 2 Timothy 4:6–8. He exhorts his spiritual "son" Timothy to all diligence and steadfastness in the face of false teachings, with advice about combating them with reference to the teachings of the past, and to patience under persecution, and to a faithful discharge of all the duties of his office, with all the solemnity of one who was about to appear before the Judge of the quick and the dead (God).

== Acts of Timothy ==
The Acts of Timothy (Acta Timothei) is a work of New Testament apocrypha, most likely from the 5th century. The Acts tell how Paul had consecrated Timothy as bishop during Nero's reign on the occasion of a visit to Ephesus which they made together. Then, under Nerva, Timothy suffers a martyr's death during a pagan festival. Timothy "attempts to put an end to the wild and violent goings-on but himself falls victim to the orgies."

The Acts of Timothy contain almost as much material about John the Evangelist, who was also a resident of Ephesus as they do about Timothy.

== See also ==
- Clement of Rome
