= Senzousa =

Town of ancient Lycaonia

Coordinates: 38°26′39″N 32°58′12″E

Senzousa was a town of ancient Lycaonia, inhabited in Byzantine times. The name does not occur among ancient authors but is inferred from epigraphic and other evidence.

Its site is located near Toprakkale, Asiatic Turkey.
