= İnlice (disambiguation) =

İnlice may refer to:

- İnlice, a town in Konya Province, Turkey
- İnlice, Fethiye, a village and beach in Muğla Province, Turkey
- İnlice, Sincik, a town in Adıyaman Province, Turkey
