= Sidamaria =

Roman town of ancient Lycaonia

Coordinates: 37°28′50″N 33°37′52″E

Sidamaria was a town of ancient Lycaonia, inhabited in Roman times. The name does not occur among ancient authors but is inferred from epigraphic and other evidence.

Its site is near Anbararası, Asiatic Turkey.
