= Derbe (Diocese) =

Roman Catholic titular see

The Diocese of Derbe is an ancient bishopric located at Derbe in the Roman province of Galatia in Asia Minor, and in the ethnic region of Lycaonia. It flourished through the Roman and Byzantine empires, being dissolved on the invasion of the Seljuks at the Battle of Manzikert in 1071. The diocese was nominally refounded as a titular see of the Roman Catholic Church in the 17th century, although the area had never actually been catholic in profession.

== History ==
Christianity came to Derbe very early. The apostles Paul and Barnabas came to Derbe after escaping a disturbance and attempted stoning in Iconium, about 60 miles away, and successfully evangelized there. Paul made many converts at Derbe including future church leaders Paul and Barnabas returned there after being stoned again in Lystra. On these experiences, Paul commented, "We must through many tribulations enter the kingdom of God." He and Silas later visited Derbe again.

=== Ancient Bishopric ===
Derbe became a suffragan see of Iconium but is not mentioned by later Notitiae Episcopatuum. Only four bishops are known, from 381 to 672. we know but four bishops, from 381 to 672.

- Daphnus, attendee at the Council of Constantinople (381).
- Thomas, attendee at the Council of Ephesus
- Paulus, attendee at the Council of Chalcedon.
- Cyricus

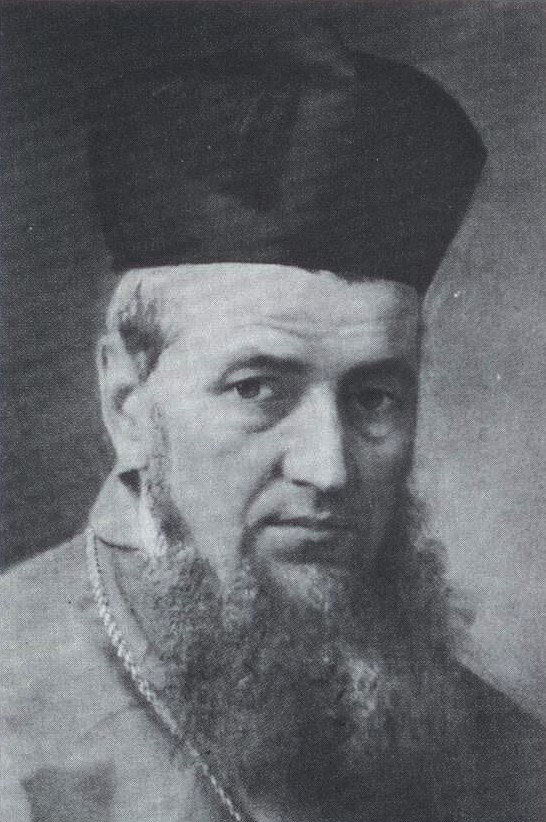
Bishop Anastasius Hartmann

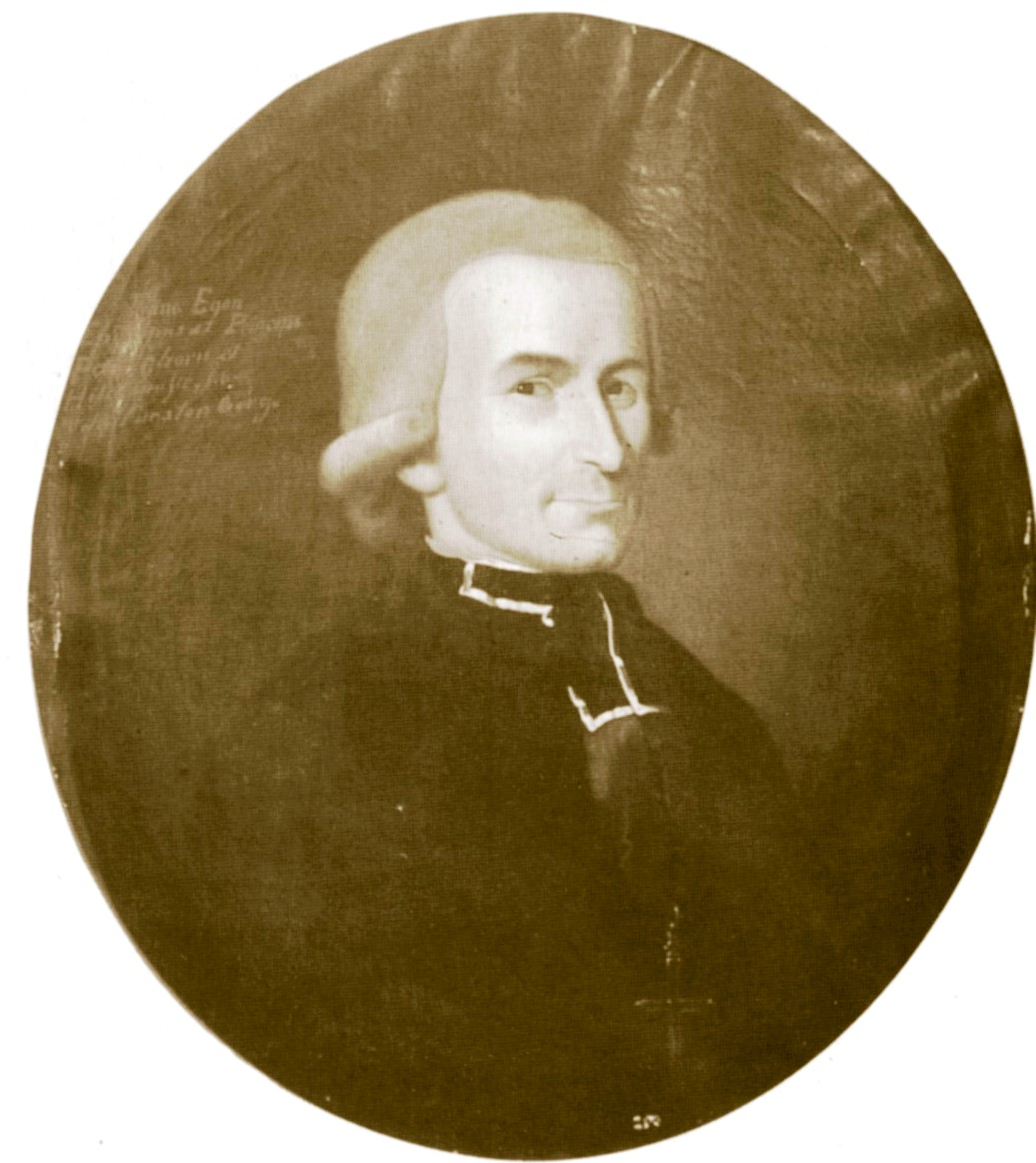
Bishop franzegon.

=== Titular see ===
Today, Derbe is included in the Catholic Church's list of titular sees. The Roman Catholic Church holds the bishopric of Derbe to be a titular see in the province of Lycaonia. Although Titular bishops have been appointed since the 17th century the see is currently empty.

- Onofrio Costantini, ( 1665 Appointed – 20 Mar 1717)
- Stephan von Clodh (Cloth), (20 Jan 1727 – 5 Sep 1727)
- Franz Egon von Fürstenberg, (24 Jul 1786 – 6 Jan 1789)
- Franz von Raigesfeld, (1 Jun 1795 Appointed – 16 Jul 1800)
- Karl Kajetan von Gaisruck (Gaysruck) (20 Jul 1801 Appointed – 16 Mar 1818)
- Michael Angelo Buono (27 Sep 1819 – )
- Anastasius Hartmann, (30 Sep 1845 Appointed – 1 May 1866)
- Giovanni Cirino (22 Nov 1869 Appointed – 8 Nov 1884 Appointed, Titular Archbishop of Ancyra)
- Vicente Alda y Sancho (7 Jun 1886 Appointed – 1 Jun 1888)
- Pietro Podaliri (23 Jun 1890 Appointed – 10 Nov 1910)
- Angelo Bartolomasi (24 Nov 1910 – 15 Dec 1919)
- Maximino Ruiz y Flores (8 Mar 1920 – 11 May 1949)
- João de Souza Lima, (14 May 1949 – 6 Feb 1955)
- Raymond Peter Hillinger † (27 Jun 1956 – 13 Nov 1971)
