= Pillitokome =

Town of ancient Lycaonia

Coordinates: 38°41′17″N 32°43′04″E

Pillitokome was a town of ancient Lycaonia, inhabited in Roman times. The name does not occur among ancient authors but is inferred from epigraphic and other evidence.

Its site is located 3 miles (5 km) west of Insuyu, Asiatic Turkey.
