= Archestratus (disambiguation) =

Archestratus was a 4th-century BC gastronomic poet.

Archestratus (Ancient Greek: Ἀρχέστρατος) may also refer to:

- Archestratus, the author of a work Περὶ Αὺλητῶν ("On the Unthinkable"), seems to be a different person from the poet mentioned above
- Archestratus (music theorist), 3rd century BC harmonic theorist
- Archestratus of Phrearrhi, Plato's neighbor
- Archestratus (general), Athenian commander at the Battle of Potidaea, 432 BC
- Archestratus (boule), member of the Athenian boule in the 5th century BCE; likely distinct from the Archestratus above
- Archestratus, banker who did business in 4th century BC Athens, owner of the slave Pasion
