= Iollas =

Son of Antipater, accused of murdering Alexander the Great

Iollas or Iolaos (Greek: Ἰόλλας or Ἰόλαος; lived 4th century BC) was the son of Antipater and the brother of Cassander, king of Macedon. He was one of the royal youths who, according to the Macedonian custom, held offices about the king's person and was cup-bearer to Alexander the Great during the period of his last illness (323 BC).

For those commentators on Alexander's death who adopted the idea of the king having been poisoned, Iollas is considered to be the person who actually administered the fatal draught at the banquet given to Alexander by Medius, who, according to this story, was an intimate friend of Iollas, and had been induced by him to take part in the plot.

Plutarch wrote that this version of events was never heard of until six years after Alexander's death (317 BC), when Olympias availed herself of this as an excuse for the cruelties she exercised upon the friends and supporters of Antipater. By that time Iollas was already dead, but she instructed that his grave be opened and desecrated with every mark of indignity.

The date and nature of Iollas' death is not mentioned anywhere. The last he is heard of is in 322 BC, when he accompanied his sister Nicaea to Asia, where she was married to Perdiccas. Hyperides proposed that the marriage was a reward to Iollas for being the murderer of Alexander.
