= Lois (biblical figure) =

Biblical figure

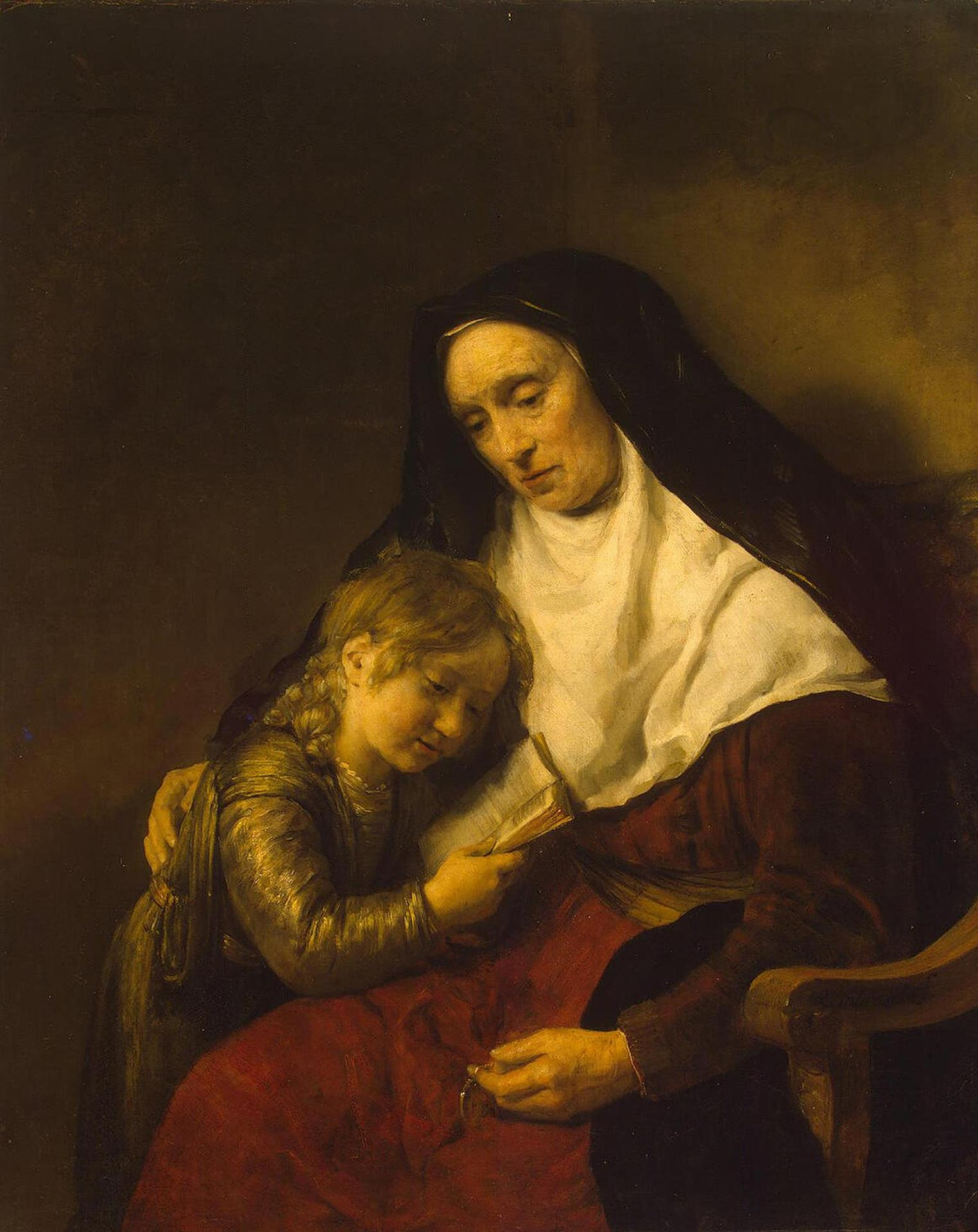
Rembrandt, Timothy and his Grandmother, 1648.

According to the New Testament, Lois (Ancient Greek: Λωΐς) was the grandmother of Timothy. According to extrabiblical tradition, she was born into the Jewish faith, and later accepted Christianity along with her daughter Eunice.

Her only biblical mention is in 2 Timothy 1:5, where the author tells Timothy

I am reminded of your sincere faith, a faith that dwelt first in your grandmother Lois and your mother Eunice and now, I am sure, dwells in you as well. (ESV)

It has been suggested that Lois, Eunice, and Timothy may have been kinsfolk of Paul, hence his apparent intimacy with the family and his knowledge of their faith.

Lois has often been used as an example for Christian grandmothers and creating a heritage of faith. Dale Evans Rogers suggests that "her example, her teachings, and her faith" were strong influences in Timothy's life.
