= 359 BC =

359 BC in various calendars
Gregorian calendar	359 BC; CCCLIX BC
Ab urbe condita	395
Ancient Egypt era	XXX dynasty, 22
Pharaoh	Nectanebo II, 2
Ancient Greek Olympiad (summer)	105th Olympiad, year 2
Assyrian calendar	4392
Balinese saka calendar	N/A
Bengali calendar	−952 – −951
Berber calendar	592
Buddhist calendar	186
Burmese calendar	−996
Byzantine calendar	5150–5151
Chinese calendar	辛酉年 (Metal Rooster); 2339 or 2132 — to — 壬戌年 (Water Dog); 2340 or 2133
Coptic calendar	−642 – −641
Discordian calendar	808
Ethiopian calendar	−366 – −365
Hebrew calendar	3402–3403
- Hindu calendars
Vikram Samvat	−302 – −301
Shaka Samvat	N/A
Kali Yuga	2742–2743
Holocene calendar	9642
Iranian calendar	980 BP – 979 BP
Islamic calendar	1010 BH – 1009 BH
Javanese calendar	N/A
Julian calendar	N/A
Korean calendar	1975
Minguo calendar	2270 before ROC 民前2270年
Nanakshahi calendar	−1826
Thai solar calendar	184–185
Tibetan calendar	阴金鸡年 (female Iron-Rooster) −232 or −613 or −1385 — to — 阳水狗年 (male Water-Dog) −231 or −612 or −1384

Year 359 BC was a year of the pre-Julian Roman calendar. At the time, it was known as the Year of the Consulship of Laenas and Imperiosus (or, less frequently, year 395 Ab urbe condita). The denomination 359 BC for this year has been used since the early medieval period, when the Anno Domini calendar era became the prevalent method in Europe for naming years.

== Events ==
=== By place ===
==== Macedonia ====
- The Macedonian King Perdiccas III is killed while defending his country against an Illyrian attack led by King Bardylis. He is succeeded by his infant son, Amyntas IV. The child's uncle, Philip II, assumes the regency.
- The Illyrians prepare to close in, the Paeonians raid from the north and two claimants to the Macedonian throne are supported by foreign powers. Philip II buys off his dangerous neighbours and, with a treaty, cedes Amphipolis to Athens.

== Births ==
- Philip III of Macedon, brother and successor of Alexander the Great (approximate date) (d. 317 BC)

== Deaths ==
- Perdiccas III, king of Macedonia
