= The Funeral of Phocion =

Painting by Nicolas Poussin

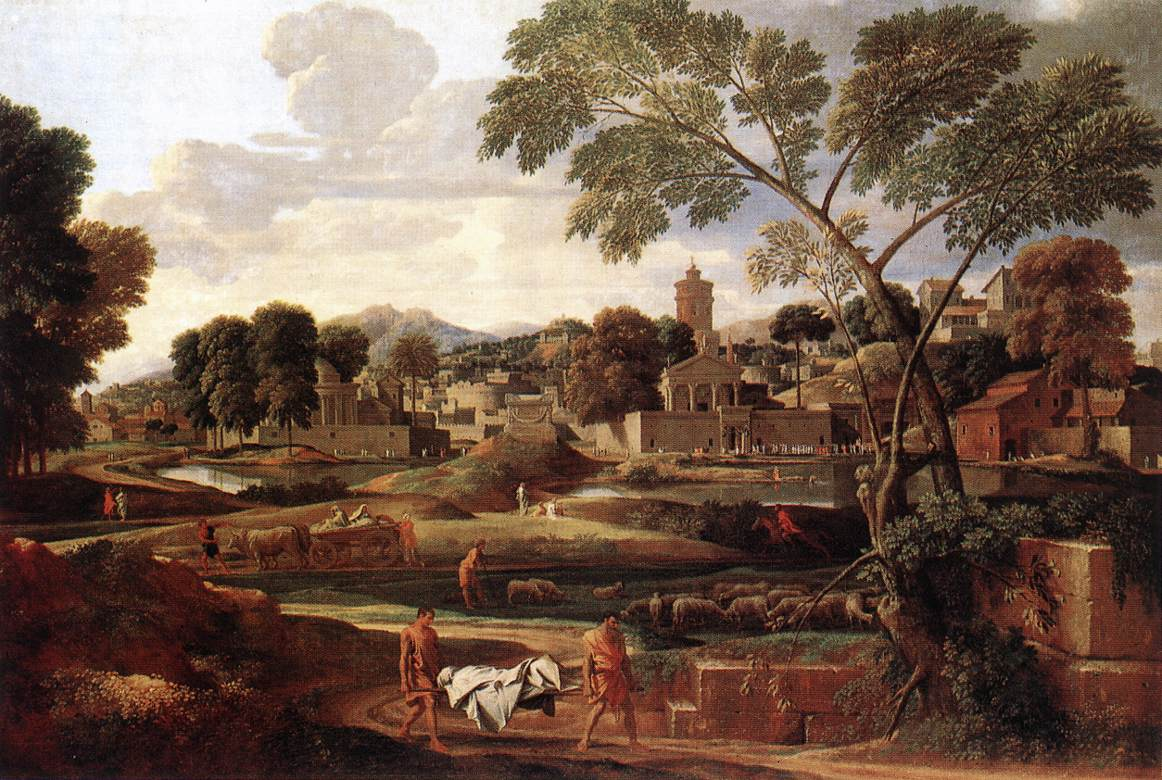
- National Museum Cardiff version of the painting
- Artist: Nicolas Poussin
- Year: 1648
- Medium: oil on canvas
- Dimensions: 117.5 cm × 178 cm (46.3 in × 70 in)
- Location: National Museum Cardiff; Cardiff

The Funeral of Phocion is a 1648 landscape painting, also known as The Burial of Phocion, Landscape with the Funeral of Phocion and Landscape with the Body of Phocion Carried out of Athens, by the French artist Nicolas Poussin. Phocion was an Athenian statesman from the 4th century BC.

Three versions of the painting are known. These are now housed in The Louvre, Paris; National Museum Cardiff and the collections of the Glass House in New Canaan, Connecticut, United States.

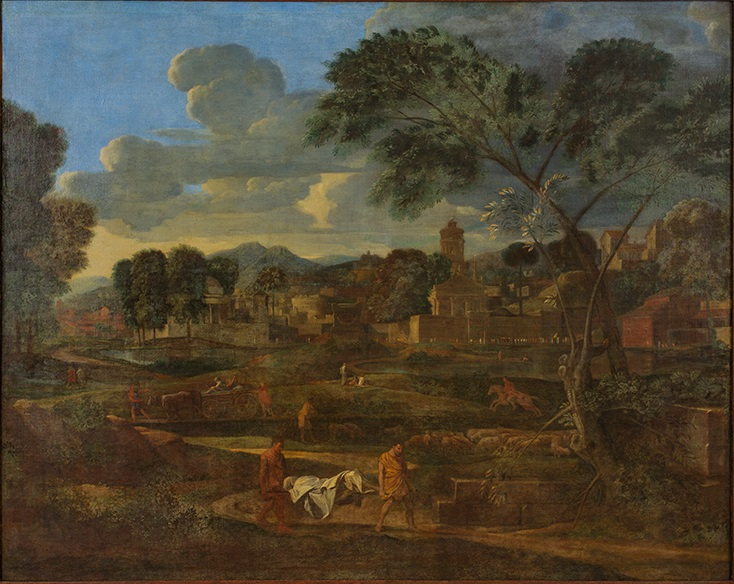
Glass House version

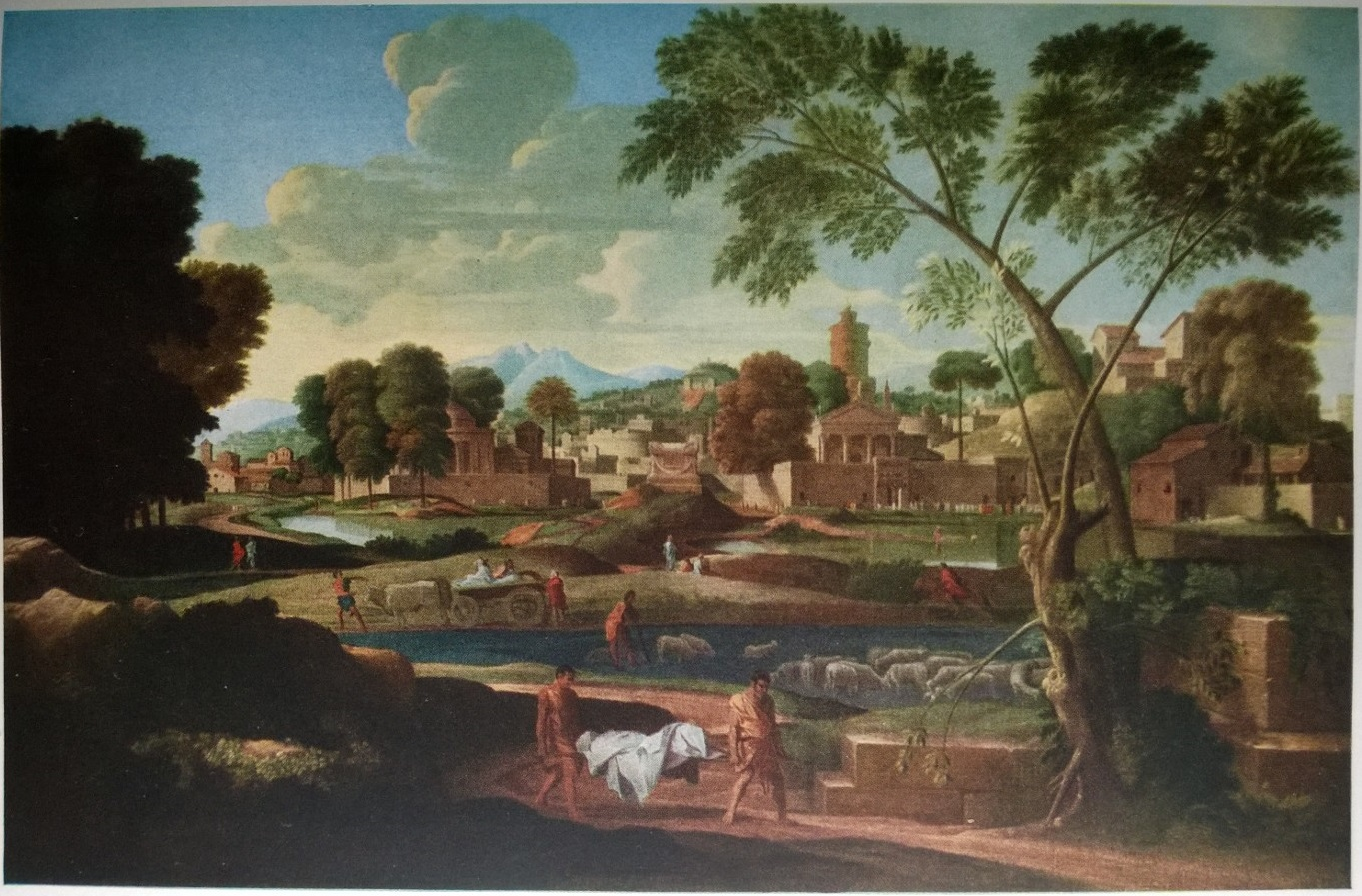
Louvre version

In the same year Poussin painted a companion piece to The Funeral of Phocion, Landscape with the Ashes of Phocion.

According to environmental historian J. Donald Hughes (1932–2019), the landscape of Attica portrayed in this painting, with lots of trees and humans living in apparent harmony with nature, might be somewhat realistic. "Poussin spent most of his working life in Rome and knew the Mediterranean landscape well, if not Greece." In this regard, he differed from some other western European artists, who rarely or never visited the Mediterranean, and "when portraying classical themes presented only idealized settings based on the more northerly landscapes they knew."

== See also ==
- List of paintings by Nicolas Poussin
