= Battle of Byzantium =

Battle during Second War of the Diadochi

Battle of Byzantium (Byzantion)
- Part of the Second War of the Diadochi
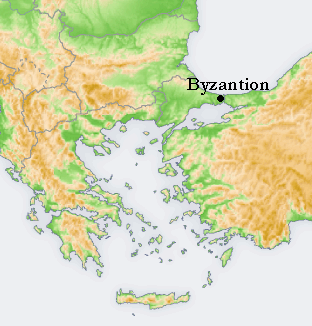
Date	317 BC
Location	near Byzantium (modern-day Istanbul, Turkey) 40.2°N 26.4°E
Result	Antigonid victory

Belligerents
Enemies of Polyperchon	Supporters of Polyperchon

Commanders and leaders
Antigonos; Nikanor	Kleitos (executed)

Strength
First battle: Diod. 100+ ships Poly. 130 ships Second battle: The sea assault: 60 ships The land assault: a large force of archers, slingers and peltasts	First battle: slightly larger Second battle: Unknown (Cleitus's entire army and fleet)

Casualties and losses
Unknown	Cleitus's entire force captured or killed

The Battle of Byzantium (Byzantion) was a 317 BC engagement between the generals Antigonus Monopthalmus and Cleitus the White, during the Second War of the Diadochi. Fought over the course of two days, near Byzantium at the Hellespont, it resulted in a stunning Antigonid victory.

== Background ==
After the death of Alexander the Great in 323 BC, his generals waged the Wars of the Diadochi, with each general attempting to claim a portion of Alexander's vast empire. One of the most talented successor generals (Diadochi) was Antigonus Monophthalmus, so called because of an eye he lost in a siege. The First War of the Diadochi ended in 321 BC with the Partition of Triparadisus; Antipater became the new regent of the empire and made Antigonus strategos of Asia, charged with hunting down and defeating the remnants of the Perdiccan faction. Antigonus led the Royal Army, reinforced with more reliable troops from Antipater's European army, against their enemies in Asia Minor. In 319 BC he went to Cappadocia and won the Battle of Orkynia against Eumenes, who escaped to the fortress of Nora. Leaving a subordinate to besiege Nora, Antigonus defeated the remaining Perdiccans at the Battle of Cretopolis. In the same year, Antipater died of old age and left the regency to Polyperchon, whose authority Antigonus refused to accept. A coalition between Antigonus, Cassander, Ptolemy and Lysimachus formed against the coalition of the new regent. In 318 BC, Antigonus confronted Cleitus the White, satrap of Lydia, and drove him out of the territory. Cleitus fled to Polyperchon, who equipped him with a large fleet and sent him to take command of the Hellespont at the beginning of the summer of 317 BC.

== Prelude ==
Antigonus had spent the autumn and winter of 318 BC in western Asia Minor consolidating his position and gathering a fleet. He now sent Nicanor with a fleet of 100–130 ships to do battle against Cleitus in the Hellespont while he himself marched there with an army. Cleitus was in the Hellespont with a slightly larger fleet.

== Battles ==
The two fleets met in battle near Byzantium, and Cleitus won a victory in which some 70 of Nicanor's ships were captured, sunk or disabled. The remaining 60 ships escaped to Chalcedon, where they were joined by Antigonus and his army. Antigonus ordered these ships to be readied for renewed action, assigning his strongest and most loyal soldiers to them as marines. Meanwhile, the Byzantines transported his archers, slingers and peltasts to the European shore, where Cleitus's victorious forces were encamped. At dawn the next day Antigonus launched an assault by land and sea; caught completely by surprise, Cleitus's entire force was captured or killed.

== Aftermath ==
Cleitus managed to escape with a single ship, but he was soon forced to run it aground and tried to reach Macedon by land. He was intercepted and executed by some soldiers working for Lysimachus . This brilliant stroke greatly enhanced Antigonus's reputation for military genius (he had won three stunning victories in a row) and freed him from further worry of Polyperchon interfering in Asia. He at once set out to deal with Eumenes who was causing trouble in Cilicia, Syria and Phoenicia.
