= Hatunsaray =

- Neighbourhood
- Location in Turkey Hatunsaray (Turkey Central Anatolia)
- Coordinates: 37°35′N 32°21′E
- Country: Turkey
- Province: Konya
- District: Meram
- Population (2022): 583
- Time zone: UTC+3 (TRT)

Hatunsaray is a neighbourhood of the municipality and district of Meram, Konya Province, Turkey. Its population is 583 (2022). Before the 2013 reorganisation, it was a town (belde).

It is located south-southeast of the ancient site of Lystra. A small museum within the village of Hatunsaray displays artifacts from ancient Lystra.
