= Zemruta =

Coordinates: 38°12′40″N 32°57′41″E

Zemruta was a town of ancient Lycaonia, inhabited in Roman times. The name does not occur among ancient authors but is inferred from epigraphic and other evidence.

Its site is located near Zulmanda Hanı, Asiatic Turkey.
