= Sağlık, Meram =

Settlement in Turkey

Sağlık
- Neighbourhood
- Location in Turkey Sağlık (Turkey Central Anatolia)
- Coordinates: 37°50′N 32°03′E
- Country: Turkey
- Province: Konya
- District: Meram
- Elevation: 1,450 m (4,760 ft)
- Population (2022): 447
- Time zone: UTC+3 (TRT)
- Postal code: 42270
- Area code: 0332

Sağlık is a neighbourhood of the municipality and district of Meram, Konya Province, Turkey. Its population is 447 (2022). Before the 2013 reorganisation, it was a town (belde). Sağlık is a small town situated on the northern slopes of a hill 45 kilometres (28 mi) to the west of Konya.

== History ==
The former name of the town was Ağrıs. After the Seljuk rule the town was annexed by the Karamanids in 1308. There were two public buildings commissioned by Karamanids in the 15th century: A religious school (Turkish: Hafızlar evi) built in 1421 and a zaviye (house of religious order) named Doğan Yörük zaviyesi. Sağlık was a village during Ottoman Empire era. In 1884 census, the total population was found to be 585. In 1971 Sağlık was declared a township.

== Economy ==
The main economic activity is agriculture and animal husbandry. The town has always been famed for hot springs. In a systematical research, it is reported that the temperature of the water is 60 °C (140 °F) and the flow rate is 55 lt/s. Thermal spas under planning or construction may contribute to town economy.
