= Ali Kireş =

Turkish footballer

Personal information
- Full name: Ali Kireş
- Date of birth: January 24, 1991 (age 35)
- Place of birth: Meram, Konya Province, Turkey
- Position: Midfielder

Team information
- Current team: Konyaspor

Youth career
- Konyaspor

Senior career*
Years	Team	Apps	(Gls)
2008–	Konyaspor	1	(0)
- * Club domestic league appearances and goals as of 02:56, 31 May 2013 (UTC) ‡ National team caps and goals as of 02:56, 28 April 2011 (UTC)

Ali Kires (born 24 January 1991) is a Turkish professional footballer who plays for Konyaspor.
