= Agnonides =

4th-century BC Greek politician

Agnonides (Gr. Ἀγνωνίδης, fl. 4th century BC) was an ancient Athenian demagogue and sycophant, a contemporary of Theophrastus and Phocion. The former was accused by Agnonides of impiety, but was acquitted by the Areopagus, and Theophrastus might have ruined his accuser had he been less generous. Agnonides was opposed to the Macedonian party at Athens, and was one of the orators who urged the Athenians to fight in the Lamian War against the Macedonians after the death of Alexander The Great. After the Macedonian victory by Antipater, Agnonides was sent into exile. He returned to Athens with Alexander, son of Polysperchon, during the Second War of the Successors. Agnonides then induced the Athenians to sentence Phocion to death as a traitor, for his role as one of the oligarchs of Athens, installed by Antipater, and for allowing the port of Piraeus to fall into the hands of Nicanor. On behalf of the Assembly, he travelled to Polysperchon to argue against leniency being shown to Phocion. After Phocion was executed, the Athenians came to regret their conduct towards him, and put Agnonides to death to appease his manes.

Agnonides was at times considered to have been the same person as the rhetorician named Agnon, but this identification is debated.
