= Lycaonian language =

Unclassified extinct language or group of languages

Lycaonian
- Native to: Lycaonia
- Region: Asia Minor
- Ethnicity: Lycaonians
- Era: c. 50 AD
- Language family: unclassified

Language codes
- ISO 639-3: None (mis)
- Glottolog: None

Lycaonian is an unclassified extinct language spoken in the former region of Lycaonia. The Lycaonians appear to have retained a distinct nationality in the time of Strabo, but their ethnic affiliations are unknown.

The Acts of the Apostles portray the people of Lystra as speaking a distinctive language or dialect around 50 AD.

The name "Lycaonia" is believed to be a Greek-adapted version of an original Lukkawanna, which would mean 'the land of the Lukka people' in an old Anatolian language related to Hittite.
