= Menyllus =

Menyllus was a Macedonian appointed by Antipater to command the garrison which Antipater had established at Munychia after the Lamian War, 322 BC. He is said by Plutarch to have been a just and good man, and to have sought as far as possible to prevent the garrison from molesting the Athenians. He was on friendly terms with Phocion, upon whom he in vain sought to force valuable presents. On the death of Antipater (319 BC) he was replaced by Nicanor.
