= Meram =

- District and municipality
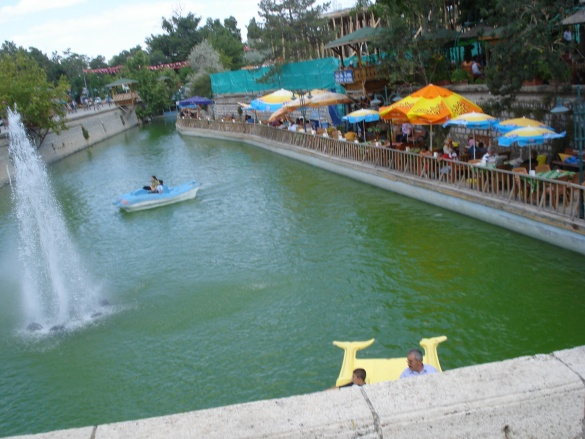
- A picnic area in Meram

- Logo

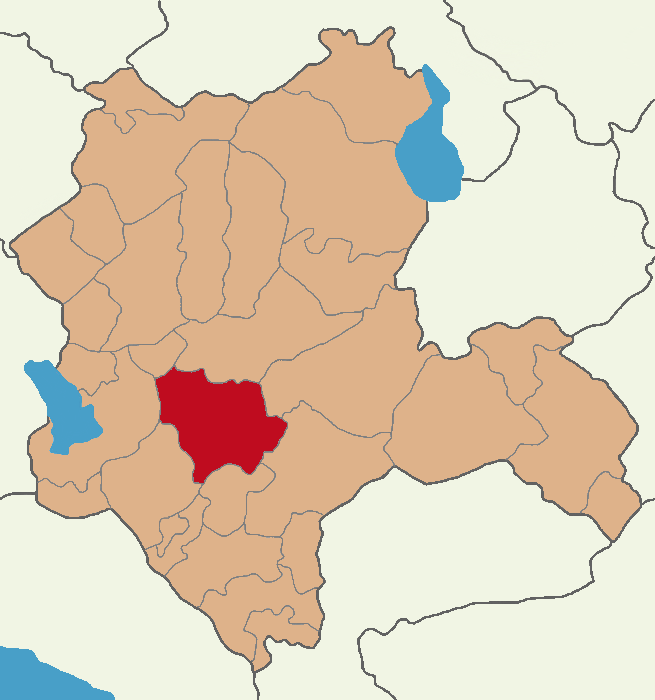
- Map showing Meram District in Konya Province

- Location within Turkey Location within Turkey Central Anatolia
- Coordinates: 37°50′11″N 32°26′18″E
- Country: Turkey
- Province: Konya

Government
  - Mayor: Mustafa Kavuş (AKP)
- Area: 1,822 km^{2} (703 sq mi)
- Elevation: 1,020 m (3,350 ft)
- Population (2024): 348,071
  - Density: 191.0/km^{2} (494.8/sq mi)
- Time zone: UTC+3 (TRT)
- Area code: 0332
- Website: www.meram.bel.tr

Meram is a municipality and district of Konya Province, Turkey. Its area is 1,822 km^{2}, and its population is 348,325 (2022). Meram is one of the central districts of Konya, along with the districts of Karatay and Selçuklu. It covers the southwestern part of the agglomeration of Konya and the adjacent countryside.

== Composition ==
There are 69 neighbourhoods in Meram District:

- Alakova
- Alavardı
- Ali Ulvi Kurucu
- Alpaslan
- Aşkan
- Ateşbaz-i Veli
- Ayanbey
- Aydoğdu
- Aymanas
- Bahçeşehir
- Bayat
- Boruktolu
- Botsa
- Boyalı
- Çarıklar
- Çaybaşı
- Çayırbağı
- Çomaklar
- Çomaklı
- Çukurçimen
- Dere
- Durunday
- Erenkaya
- Evliyatekke
- Gödene
- Hadimi
- Harmancık
- Hasanşeyh
- Hatıp
- Hatunsaray
- Havzan
- İkipınar
- İnlice
- Karaağaç
- Karadiğin
- Karadiğinderesi
- Karahüyük
- Kaşınhanı
- Kavak
- Kayadibi
- Kayalı
- Kayıhüyük
- Kilistra
- Kızılören
- Konevi
- Kovanağzı
- Köyçeğiz
- Kozağaç
- Kumralı
- Lalebahce
- Melikşah
- Osmangazi
- Pamukçu
- Pirebi
- Sadıklar
- Sağlık
- Sahibiata
- Sarıkız
- Sefaköy
- Uluğbey
- Uluırmak
- Uzunharmanlar
- Yaka
- Yatağan
- Yaylapınar
- Yenibahçe
- Yenişehir
- Yeşildere
- Yeşiltekke

== Sister cities ==
Meram is twinned with:

- Akjoujt, Inchiri Region, Mauritania

== Notable residents ==
- Ali Kireş (born 1991), footballer
- Abdülkerim Bardakcı (born 1994), footballer
