= İnlice =

Settlement in Turkey

- Neighbourhood
- Location in Turkey İnlice (Turkey Central Anatolia)
- Coordinates: 37°42′N 32°04′E
- Country: Turkey
- Province: Konya
- District: Meram
- Elevation: 1,530 m (5,020 ft)
- Population (2022): 724
- Time zone: UTC+3 (TRT)
- Postal code: 42270
- Area code: 0332

İnlice is a neighbourhood of the municipality and district of Meram, Konya Province, Turkey. Its population is 724 (2022). Before the 2013 reorganisation, it was a town (belde).

== Geography ==
İnlice is to the south west of Konya city at a distance of 60 kilometres (37 mi). The altitude of the town is 1,530 metres (5,020 ft).

== Economy ==
The main economic activity is animal husbandry. Cereal and potato production as well as beekeeping are other activities. But the population is on the decrease, a sign of insufficient arable lands. However in 2010 State Hydraulic Works (DSİ) of Turkey has announced the discovery of thermal source within İnlice. The level of the source is 493 metres (1,617 ft) below the ground level with a temperature of 55 °C (131 °F) İnlice residents hope that the future thermal tourism may help to improve the town economy.
