= Nicanor (son of Antipater) =

Ancient Macedonian nobleman

Nicanor (Ancient Greek: Νικάνωρ; c. 350 – c. 317 BC) was a Macedonian nobleman, son of Antipater, regent of Macedon, and brother of Cassander, king of Macedon. He appears to have spent Alexander's reign at his father's court in Pella.

At the Partition of Triparadisus in 321/320 BC, after the death of the regent Perdiccas, Nicanor was appointed satrap of Cappadocia, replacing Eumenes of Cardia. Waterfield presumes that when Antigonus moved to consolidate his position in Asia Minor in 318, Nicanor found himself redundant and fled to Macedon. In 317 BC, following the deaths of Philip III Arrhidaeus and Adea Eurydice, Olympias had Nicanor put to death, claiming to be avenging the death of Alexander the Great.
