= Tamynae =

Town of ancient Euboea

Coordinates: 38°29′58″N 24°06′15″E

Tamynae or Tamynai (Ancient Greek: Ταμύναι), or Tamyna (Ταμύνα), was a town of ancient Euboea in the territory of Eretria, at the foot of Mount Cotylaeum, with a temple of Apollo, said to have been built by Admetus. It was taken by the Persians, when they attacked Eretria in 490 BCE, but it is chiefly memorable for the victory which the Athenians, under Phocion, gained here over Callias of Chalcis in 350 BCE.

Its site is located near the modern village of Avlonari.
