= Henry Lejeune =

English painter (1819–1904)

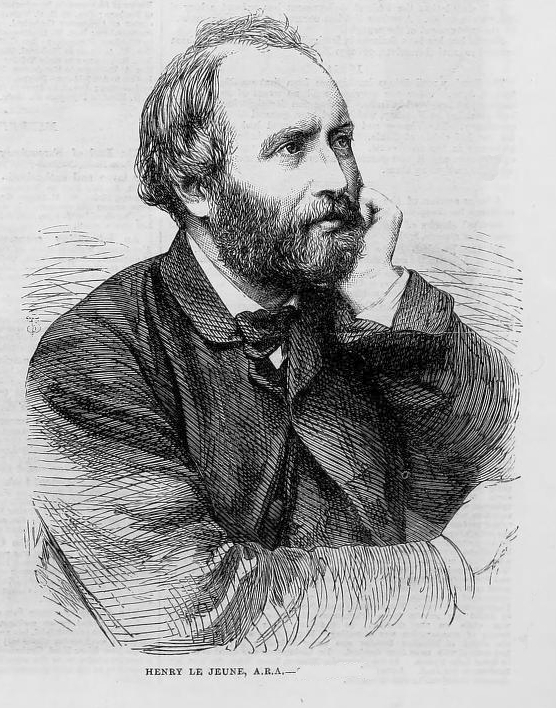
- Born: 12 December 1819; London
- Died: 5 October 1904 (aged 84); Hampstead
- Known for: Painting; watercolour
- Movement: Royal Academy

Henry Le Jeune ARA (12 December 1819 – 5 October 1904) was an English painter of landscapes, genre, literary and biblical scenes. He became well known for his genre paintings of children.

== Life ==
Henry Le Jeune was born in London, the son of Anthony Le Jeune, a professional musician of Flemish origin, and the third of five children. After showing an early interest in art he was encouraged by his family to study the art collections in the British Museum.

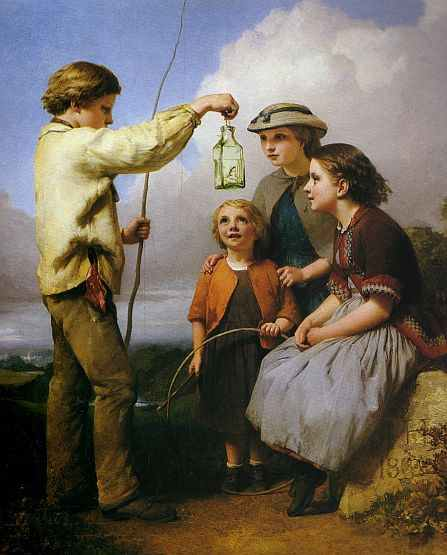
The Eft (1862)

In 1834, Le Jeune was admitted to the Royal Academy where, after winning 4 silver medals in succession, he won a gold medal in 1841 for the biblical painting "Samson Bursting his Bonds" (exhibited the following year at the British Institution). He first exhibited at the Royal Academy in 1840 with a work entitled "Joseph Interpreting the Dream of Pharaoh's Chief Butler".

From 1845-48 he taught at the Government School of design at Somerset House, and from 1848-64 was curator and instructor at the Royal Academy. He was elected an Associate of the Royal Academy (ARA) in 1863 and an honorary retired associate in 1886.

== Family ==
Le Jeune married Dorothy Lewis (1815–1864) on 21 June 1844 and had five sons and three daughters. He lived in London all his life, dying in Hampstead in 1904. He was buried in Kensal Green Cemetery.

== Work ==
Le Jeune painted in both oils and watercolours. His works were exhibited at the Royal Academy from 1840–94, at the British Institution between 1842–63, and at other galleries. Early in his career he painted mainly biblical or literary scenes (Shakespeare or Spenser). These included such titles as "The infancy of Moses" (1842), "Prospero and Miranda" (1844), "Ruth and Boaz (1845), "The Sermon on the mount" (1845) and "The liberation of the slaves" (1847 - which was purchased by Prince Albert).

From the 1850s, he became well known as a genre painter. In this category belong works such as "Little Red Riding Hood" (1863), "Early sorrow" (1869), "Little Bo Peep" (1873 and 1881), "Much ado about nothing" (1873) and many others.

Le Jeune has painting in several art galleries in the United Kingdom including those in Wolverhampton and Liverpool.
