= Phocion =

4th-century BCE Athenian statesman and general

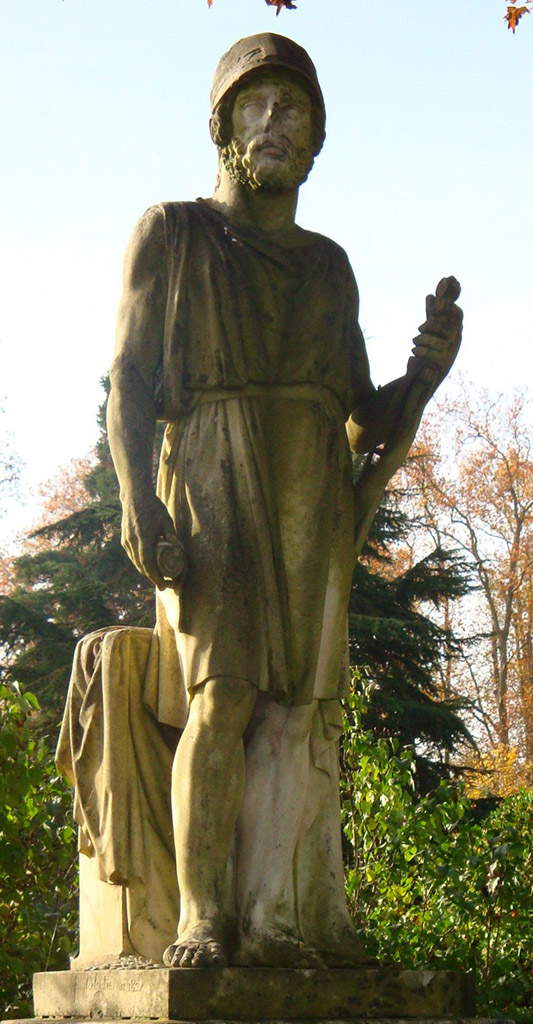
Sculpture of Phocion, by François-Nicolas Delaistre, 1824.

Phocion (/ˈfoʊʃiən, -ˌɒn/; Ancient Greek: Φωκίων Φώκου Ἀθηναῖος Phokion; c. 402 – c. 318 BC), nicknamed The Good (ὁ χρηστός ho khrēstos), was an Athenian statesman and strategos, and the subject of one of Plutarch's Parallel Lives.

Phocion was a successful politician of Athens. He believed that extreme frugality was the condition for virtue and lived in accord with this; consequently, he was popularly known as "The Good." Further, people thought that Phocion was the most honest member of the Athenian Assembly. However, within this chamber, Phocion's tendency to strong opposition relegated him to a solitary stand against the entire political class. Nonetheless, by both his individual prestige and his military expertise, which was acquired by the side of Chabrias, Phocion was elected strategos numerous times, with a record 45 terms in office. Thus, during most of his 84 years of life, Phocion occupied the most important Athenian offices.

In the late 320s, when Macedon gained complete control of Athens (under Antipater), though somewhat compromised, Phocion defended both the urban center and its citizens. He even refused to comply with some dishonorable requests of the enemy. However, his stance put Phocion in opposition to both Polyperchon, the regent of Macedon, and most free Athenians. Polyperchon sent him back to Athens, where he was sentenced to death for treason by the then-restored popular assembly.

== Early life ==
Phocion's grandfather was perhaps the trierarch Phocion who was killed at the Battle of Cynossema in 411 BC.

During his youth, Phocion sought to study liberal notions. He was both Plato's pupil and Xenocrates's friend. Through such philosophical education, Phocion was of virtuous moral character and he used to give prudent advice. This academic training left its mark upon him, but it was as a soldier rather than as a philosopher that he first came to notice.

Phocion's first wife was sister to the sculptor Cephisodotus the Elder, making him perhaps the uncle of Praxiteles. His second wife was famous in Athens for her humility. Once she said that her sole adornment was Phocion's twentieth strategos appointment. Phocion's son was Phocus. During his youth he became licentious and addicted to partying and wine, so Phocion sent him off to Sparta (which was famous for frugal lifestyles) for a period.

== Early military service to Athens ==
The young Phocion enrolled with Chabrias's armies, in many campaigns, gaining much experience. Chabrias esteemed him highly because Phocion helped to compensate for his turbulent personality. Reciprocally, Phocion was commended for the chief actions of his campaigns, and thus gained much fame among the Athenians.

In 376 BC, Phocion's participation was crucial in the Athenian naval victory of Naxos, where he commanded the leading left wing. Since it was the first clear Athenian victory since the Peloponnesian War, the Athenians greatly honoured its military leaders. The battle took place on the main day of the Eleusinian Mysteries and was remembered for years.

After Chabrias died, Phocion took care of his family and particularly of his son, Ctesippus. However, Phocion could barely cope with Ctesippus's rather slow character. At last he exclaimed "O Chabrias, did ever a man show so much gratitude as I do in putting up with your son"

== Role in the Athenian Assembly ==
Publicly, Phocion was recognized as the most austere and wisest Athenian politician. However, in the Athenian Assembly, he had an attitude of opposition to most of his peers, and criticism from Phocion was often unpopular within the chamber. Once, an oracle was brought from Delphi. It said that one man would confront the rest of the politicians, whose opposing stand would be homogeneous. Phocion then rose, exclaiming: "I am that person who disagrees." Once, after Phocion was applauded by the chamber he asked his friends: "Have I unwittingly said something vile?" Demosthenes called him "the chopper of my speeches."

On another occasion, Phocion spoke but was not heeded and not permitted to continue. He said: "You may compel me to act against my wishes, but you shall never force me to speak against my judgment."

On the other hand, Phocion never harmed anyone he disliked. Indeed, he was so kind that he helped a political rival if he was in some difficulty. Additionally, Phocion was unhappy that Athenian public functions had become split between two groups. Whereas the politicians dealt eminently with civilian matters, military issues were attended to exclusively by the generals. He campaigned for Athens to regain its old tradition, with politicians who could manage both sets of affairs.

Parrying the eloquence of his opponents, Phocion resorted both to wise concepts and pithy sayings, which were famous in antiquity. Yet he avoided demagogic style and his tone was harsh and demanding, with few embellishments. Another distinguishing quality was that Phocion compressed many ideas into short phrases. Before any presentation, he spent much time considering how to shorten it. One of his friends said "You seem to be thinking about something, Phocion", and he replied "Yes, I am considering whether I can shorten the speech I am going to make."

=== Anecdotes ===
When someone made a joke about his severe visage, and some of the local politicians he was not on good terms with laughed in response, he remarked, "My frown never yet made any of you sad, but these jolly men have given you plenty of sorrow."

Demosthenes once said to Phocion that he might be killed some day, if the people became irrational. Phocion responded: "Yes; however, they would kill you if they came to their senses."

On an occasion when Phocion was being heavily attacked by the entire assembly, he requested Archibiades, a man who liked imitating the Spartan lifestyle, to support his stand. However, the man took the popular side, declaring against Phocion as well. Phocion then grabbed his Spartan-style beard, saying, "It's time for you to shave."

Another assemblyman, Aristogeiton, was famous because he usually called for war. However, when a muster was called he happened to appear wearing bandages around his legs and walking with a cane. Phocion got up and shouted to the enrolling officer: "Put down Aristogeiton too, as lame and unfit for service." Some time afterward, Aristogeiton was jailed and at his request, Phocion visited him often. His friends criticized him for it, but he replied: "Come on! There is no better place to visit Aristogeiton."

During a boundary dispute with Thebes, Phocion urged negotiations, while most Athenians called for war. He argued, "You had better carry on the contest with the weapons you use best: your tongues."

Polyeuctos, an out-of-shape Athenian politician, once made a speech advocating war with Philip II of Macedon, stopping repeatedly to drink water and catch his breath. During one such pause Phocion remarked, "Here is a fine man to lead us into war. What do you think he'll do when he is carrying his shield and armor to meet the enemy, if giving a speech has nearly killed him with exhaustion?"

== Military career ==
Although Phocion never canvassed the Athenians for it, he was appointed strategos a record-breaking 45 times. Sometimes he did not attend the election meetings of the Agora and the people were forced to seek him afterward. However, he accepted the appointment on every occasion.

=== Management of the Second Athenian League ===
Phocion was sent to the Aegean Sea by Chabrias, to collect the regional tributes for the Second Athenian League. As representatives of Athens were unpopular among their 'subject' allies, Phocion had been issued 20 warships. However, he declined to bring them along, commenting that "if he was being sent to fight the islanders he would need a larger force, but if he was visiting them as allies, one ship was enough." So he departed just with his own trireme. At each city, Phocion negotiated each fee so diplomatically that he returned home with a large allied fleet, which protected their treasury. The allies even organized colourful parades in his honour.

=== Military service to Persia in Cyprus ===
Between 351–349 BC, Phocion helped the Persian Emperor Artaxerxes III to subdue the Cypriot rebellion.

=== Campaign in Euboea against Macedonia ===
In 349 BC, Philip II of Macedon invaded Euboea and established many local tyrants. Phocion went there with a small force, expecting to win over the Euboeans by diplomatic means. But Philip had organised a strong bribe network which corrupted the local politicians. Phocion established his camp on a hill outside the city of Tamynae, and ordered his men to ignore those who neglected their duties because of Macedonian bribes. He explained: "They are useless to us and furthermore, they will get in the way of those that are loyal."

In 348 BC, with Macedonian support, the Euboean general Callias brought his armies to attack the camp. Phocion decided to offer many religious sacrifices before battle, until the gods were favourable. However such activities demanded much time, and the forces of the Euboean mercenaries attacked the enemy, their general thinking Phocion was a coward and hoping to force his hand. The Athenian cavalry was ill-disciplined, and not wishing to remain idle, raced out to meet the enemy, but with no formation and in scattered groups, so that they were easily beaten and routed. The Euboeans defeated the mercenaries and they began ravaging the Athenian camp. After Phocion could interpret his sacrifices favorably (or alternatively to draw the enemy in), he led his main lines into battle while the enemy where surging up the palisade thinking they had defeated Phocion's forces. This resulted in Phocion cutting down and routing the enemy forces. Just with his best men while the main body of the army rallied some of the previously dispersed troops, Phocion engaged the enemy's chief divisions, in a ferocious battle. Phocion was victorious but then freed the captured enemies, fearing the Athenians might treat them too harshly.

Subsequently, Phocion captured the fort of Zaretra, which was at Euboea island's narrowest portion. Then, he returned to Athens.

=== Campaign to repel Philip II from Byzantium ===
With his armies, Philip II reached the Dardanelles, expecting successively to seize Chersonesus, Perinthus, and Byzantium. The Athenians sent Chares to confront him but the Greek colonies reacted negatively to him, as usual. Consequently, the force could do nothing except roam around the region. The Athenians were so angry that they wanted to cancel the expedition. Phocion interceded, saying: "You shouldn't be angry at our allies. You should blame our generals, because of whom we are feared even by those who need us most."

Then, in 339 BC, Phocion was sent to the region. To Phocion's good fortune, it transpired that Leon, a personal friend from the academy and a Byzantine well known for his courage, personally guaranteed the Athenian's good faith. Thus, particularly there, the new expedition was amicably received and, even though Phocion had planned to camp outside the walls, was welcomed into the city, where the Athenian soldiers acted with exemplary discipline and courtesy. The Athenian soldiers also fought bravely, defending the site. Then, Phocion attacked the Macedonians around the region, liberating many cities, which expelled their Macedonian garrisons. Eventually, Macedonia was forced to withdraw from the region (temporarily, as it turned out).

However, Phocion was wounded so he returned to Athens.

Secretly, the Megarians requested military help from Phocion, who arrived with his army and was warmly received. He erected two long walls, from Megara to the seaport of Nisaea. The Megarians felt so safe that they allied with Athens.

== Confrontation with Macedonia ==
=== Subjection of Athens by Philip II ===
Regarding Macedonia, Phocion's moderate stand was to avoid a confrontation which might be catastrophic for Athens. Although he had been successful in his campaigns against it, he had come to view Macedon as a rising power, and to doubt the wisdom of an Athenian foreign policy too strongly opposed to it. However, the Athenians preferred the firebrand orators who desired war. Among them were Demosthenes, Lycurgus, and Hypereides. They were particularly emboldened because Athens seemed to have sufficient military power. Philip, on the other hand, preferred not to go to war with Athens; he hoped instead the Athenians would consent to put their strong navy at his disposal for use against Persia.

Phocion was touring the Aegean colonies when Athens commanded its generals to confront Philip. He came back and addressed the assembly, opposing this course of action. A lawyer asked him if he was defying the people's will, and Phocion responded: "Yes, even though I know that if there is war I will be your boss, and if there is peace you will be mine." Unfortunately, Athens could not be persuaded to reverse its decision. When the strategy to be used against Philip came under discussion, the question arose as to whether it would be better to engage in battle close to home or at a distance. Phocion advised, "Let us not ask where we should fight, but how we may win. That will be the way to keep war at a distance. If we are beaten in a distant battle, it will soon be at our doors." In the event, Athens and her allies suffered a crushing defeat at Chaeronea, in 338 BC. Then the Athenian aristocracy supported the nomination of Phocion for strategos, and the Areopagus passed it.

Phocion delayed the inevitable garrisoning of defeated Athens as long as possible. Initially, he favored negotiating directly with Philip, who he thought could be expected to be lenient, and opposed having Athens join a congress of Greek states and be forced to accept Macedonia's common terms of peace, which were not yet known. Demades, however, offered a contrary motion, and the Athenians approved it. They soon regretted their decision, since at the congress Philip obliged the Athenians to provide him with both ships and cavalry. When the Athenians expressed remorse, Phocion said: "I was opposed to the motion, fearing this. Now the deed is done, and we must make the best of it. We shouldn't be without hope, though. Our ancestors suffered similar episodes of subjection, but they carried on, and because of that both Athens and Greece as a whole survived." Later, after Philip died (336 BC), Phocion banned all celebratory sacrifice, saying: "The army which defeated us at Chaeronea has lost just one man."

=== Relations with Alexander ===
When the new Macedonian king, Alexander, was about to attack Thebes, Demosthenes protested impudently. Phocion interceded, with some lines of Homer: "Foolhardy man, why provoke one whose temper is already savage? Why provoke this Macedonian who is full of limitless ambition? When there is a holocaust on our borders, do you wish to spread the flames to our city as well, by provoking him further? My whole object in taking up the burdens of this office is to prevent this, and I shall not allow my fellow citizens to destroy themselves, even if they wish it." Thebes was destroyed and Alexander demanded the handover of the most anti-Macedonian Athenians, among whom was Demosthenes. The assembly called upon Phocion repeatedly by name until he stood on his feet. Beside him, Phocion called Nicocles, his best friend, saying: "We have been brought to a pass. I would deliver Nicocles if they might request it. We must reduce the wrath of our conqueror, rather than oppose him." Nonetheless, the Athenian Assembly passed a decree denying the demand.

Then, when Alexander refused to see other Athenian ambassadors, Phocion was sent. As Phocion had been regarded as a respectable person by Philip, his son received him attentively, listening to his proposals. Alexander was persuaded to relent in his demand for the opposing Athenian politicians (even though they were enemies of Phocion as well). Indeed, Alexander asked for advice and Phocion said: "If Macedonia wishes peace, it should abandon the war. If Macedonia desires glory, it should turn against Persia, instead of oppressing Greece." Eventually, Phocion was favored by the king, even over many Macedonians. After Alexander defeated the Persian Emperor Darius III, Phocion was among the few individuals who were saluted with the word "greetings" by the king in his correspondence. During this period, Phocion maintained his policy of peace. Alexander made a request for a number of Athenian warships which Phocion supported, saying: "You should either possess superior strength or side with those that do."

=== Lamian War ===
In 323 BC, rumors of Alexander's death reached Athens. Phocion feared any hasty reaction and he commented: "If he is dead now, he will be dead tomorrow as well. We must be cautious before celebrating." The Macedonian leaders began fighting for the crown; Antipater was the candidate with the best prospects. The Athenians hastened to rebel against Macedonia. Leosthenes, the rebel leader, shared the charge of strategos with Phocion. This was the beginning of the Lamian War although, as always, Phocion opposed it.

Leosthenes inquired about which historical achievements Phocion had attained. Phocion responded: "Do you think it is nothing then that our citizens are all buried at home in their own tombs?" Other assemblymen asked him whether the military preparations were enough or not. Phocion said: "They will be sufficient for a sprint. However, if it is to be a long race, then I fear for Athens for she has no reserves of either men, supplies or warships."

Phocion was ordered to lead the military actions against Boeotia. Cleverly, he called on all Athenians under the age of 60 years to enroll. The elderly protested but Phocion responded: "This is fair! Although I am 80 years old, I will lead the attack." This calmed the people down.

On the other front, Antipater retreated and he was surrounded by the Greeks, around Lamia. The Athenians were exultant. Phocion said: "I would have wished being the general who achieved this victory. Nonetheless, still I would have counseled as before." As more good news arrived, Phocion said: "I am wondering when the good news will end." Leosthenes soon died in fighting Macedonian forces making a sally out of besieged Lamia. A new strategos, Antiphilus, was appointed, to counterbalance Phocion.

In 322 BC, Phocion hurriedly led a force of Athenians against Micion, who had disembarked at Rhamnus with an army composed of Macedonians and mercenaries. So many individuals came to him with military advice that he exclaimed, "Heracles, how many generals we have, and how few soldiers!" Then he attacked the enemy and utterly routed them, killing Micion. Simultaneously, the Greeks defeated the Macedonians, at Thessaly. However, Craterus brought a large army over from Asia, and the Greeks were defeated at Crannon, also in 322 BC.

Antipater soon approached Athens. Demades, who was another peace advocate, was the only other Athenian leader who didn't flee. He proposed that an embassy should negotiate peace. Phocion commented: "If I had been listened to before, the Athenians wouldn't need to be discussing such things." At Thebes, both met Antipater, whose invasion of Attica was expected imminently. Phocion was well received. When Phocion asked Antipater to cease his advance and listen to peace proposals, Craterus protested that it was unfair that the army should sit idle in allied lands, damaging their economies, while the enemy lands could be so easily ravaged. Antipater's lone demand was the discretional surrendering of Athens. In a second encounter, at which Antipater scorned the presence of Xenocrates, Phocion heard the new Macedonian terms of peace:

- Many Athenian politicians such as Demosthenes would be turned over to the Macedonians.
- The Athenian suffrage would be restricted to landowners.
- A garrison would be established in Munychia, the neighborhood next to Piraeus.
- Athens would pay both the war expenses and an extra fine.

Phocion argued against the garrisoning unsuccessfully. However, Phocion knew its Macedonian commander, Menyllus, personally. 12,000 Athenians were disfranchised and many people were forced to migrate to Thrace. Phocion helped by securing some exiles citizenship in the Peloponnesus area.

== Oligarchy of Demades and Phocion ==
Phocion became the virtual ruler of Athens and he strove to keep the peace. By his influence, only just individuals were appointed magistrates, and people who were too rebellious weren't allowed to hold public office. However, Phocion refused when Antipater requested him to do dishonorable things, commenting: "I can't be both his friend and his flatterer." Additionally, he protected the refugee Harpalus.

The aftermath of these events was that Phocion became quite unpopular. He was accused of delivering Athens to Antipater. The Athenians were particularly angry about the fate of Demosthenes, who had been banished, dying soon after. Phocion had been supported by him early in his political career, even in some capital trials. Thus, it seemed like a personal betrayal.

== Crisis of Polyperchon ==
In 319 BC, before his death, Antipater chose that, instead of his own son, Cassander, General Polyperchon would be the next Macedonian ruler. Soon, Cassander began conspiring against Polyperchon. Thus, Cassander disposed that, at Munychia, Nicanor replaced Menyllus, with the order of controlling Attica. In Athens, Phocion was accused of helping such concealments of Cassander and, by deliberately delaying military action against Nicanor, made it possible for Nicanor to take the Piraeus, but he slighted such rumors. Indeed, Phocion met Nicanor, requesting a mild treatment for the Athenians. Also, Phocion convinced Nicanor to host the local games. The Macedonian spent lavishly on the event.

Athenians were divided between two parties. Phocion belonged to the oligarchic party of the rich minority, which was on Cassander's side. The majority of the citizens however supported Polyperchon, because he promised to restore democracy, allow Athenian exiles (60% of all Athenian citizens before the Lamian War) to return, and remove the occupying Macedonian garrison. Still as strategos, Phocion supported Nicanor openly. He spurned an insistent rumor that Nicanor would attempt invading Athens. At Piraeus, Phocion was holding a conference with Nicanor when Athenian soldiers attempted to jail the Macedonian general. Phocion helped his escape, declaring: "I don't believe that he would harm Athens although, still, I would defend him if he may wrong us." Subsequently, the Athenian Assembly commanded that Phocion should attack Nicanor, at Munychia. Initially, Phocion refused. Then, effectively, Nicanor used the troops of the Macedonian garrison to seize Piraeus, with Phocion's compliance. When Phocion decided to attack them, the Athenian soldiers had already rebelled against his command as strategos.

In 318 BC, Polyperchon decided to realign Athenian politics in his own interests. Favoring the popular party, he restored all liberties. His son, Alexander, arrived in Athens with a Macedonian army, while Athenian exiles (more than half of the entire citizen body) returned home, expecting revenge against the politicians who had betrayed the democracy. Polyperchon expected that Phocion would be forced to leave the urban center. Moreover, the Macedonians would seize complete control of Athens. Phocion was immediately deposed as strategos by an informal assembly.

== Death ==
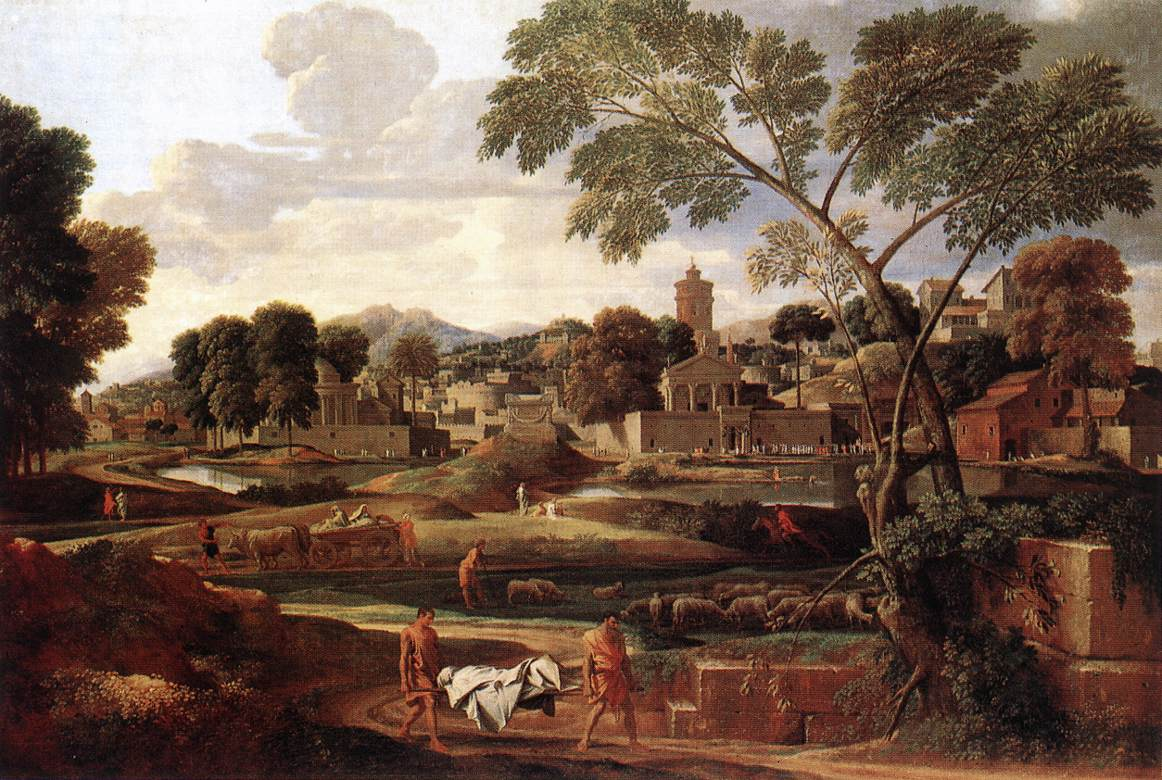
The Funeral of Phocion by Nicolas Poussin (1648)

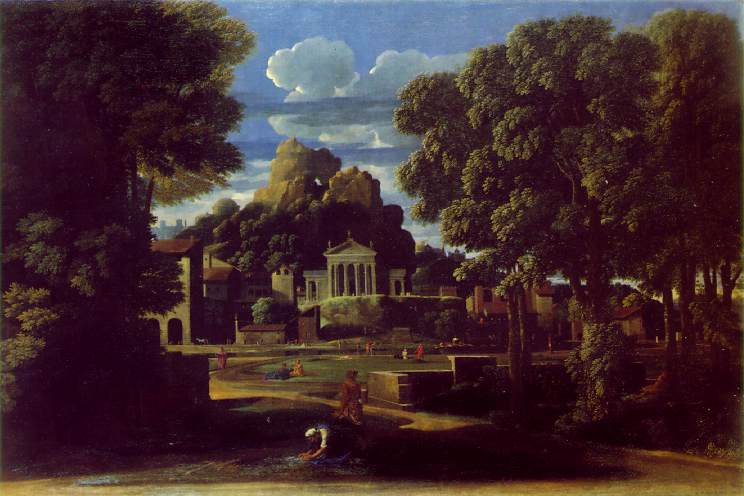
The ashes of Phocion collected by his widow by Nicolas Poussin (1648)

The Athenian orator Agnonides accused Phocion of treachery, for he had refused, and then delayed, to attack Nicanor. Phocion decided to meet Polyperchon personally. Phocion gathered an entourage, composed of politicians who were well regarded by the Macedonian ruler. However, their voyage was delayed by the illness of one member. During that interval, Agnonides proposed another embassy to accuse Phocion formally before the regent, and the Athenian Assembly passed the motion. Both delegations arrived in Phocis simultaneously. When Phocion started speaking, Polyperchon began interrupting him and Phocion struck the floor with his staff, refusing to utter another word. Polyperchon ordered the detention of Phocion and his associates; most of whom escaped.

In a letter, Polyperchon announced that the prisoners should be judged by the people of Athens. Phocion was brought before an assembly of Athenians. The Athenian archons conducted the proceedings and Plutarch alleges that attendees included slaves, foreigners, and those formerly disfranchised. The letter from Polyperchon was read while the entire multitude cried out against the oligarchs. Phocion asked, "Do you wish to condemn us justly? Then, you should listen to our defence" and said "I admit that I have wronged and deserve condemnation for my political actions. However, these other individuals don't." Some people responded that they should be condemned for being his friends. Then Phocion gave up. Subsequently, Agnonides read the condemning motion, which was passed enthusiastically. Thus, Phocion and ten acquaintances were sentenced to die by drinking hemlock.

They were conducted to a prison to be executed on 19 May 318 BC. According to Plutarch, the poison ran out and the executioner refused to prepare more unless he was paid 12 drachmas. Phocion remarked, "In Athens, it is hard for a man even to die without paying for it." A friend paid the executioner the extra sum on his behalf; Phocion drank his poison and died. It was decreed that the corpse could not be buried or cremated in Attica. A hired man brought it across the Megarian frontier, where the body was burned. Phocion's wife set up an empty tomb, brought Phocion's bones and heart home by night, and buried them there. Soon afterward, Cassander gained control of the city and established a new oligarchy, which reburied Phocion's remains at public expense and erected a bronze statue of him. The oligarchs executed Agnonides, while Phocion's son Phocus killed two of his other accusers who had fled the city.

== Phocion "The Good" ==
Phocion's recognized probity bestowed on him the cognomen "The Good". Phocion could have been extremely wealthy, either by his offices or by the high commissions which were managed by him. Instead, ancient sources report that he was incorruptible and led an extremely frugal lifestyle. Plutarch claims that he had a reserved demeanor; he was never seen either laughing or weeping. Indeed, he appeared quite severe, and was often feared by those meeting him for first time. Phocion believed that frugality proved his own virtue. He was never seen at the public baths. Both on the Athenian streets and on campaign, he walked around wearing a simple tunic and without shoes. He only made an exception in extreme cold, wearing a cloak, so other soldiers said that Phocion gave a meteorological indication. His wife baked their everyday bread and cooked their everyday meals herself, and Phocion drew water, pumping it with his own hands.

Plutarch reports a number of incidents when Macedonian leaders attempted to bribe Phocion and he refused. Philip II offered much money to him and the Macedonian heralds mentioned the future needs of his sons. Phocion responded, "If my sons are like me, my farm, which has enabled my present eminence, will suffice for them. If, instead, they become spoiled by luxury, I will not be the individual who will be guilty for that." Alexander sent a delegation to Phocion to offer him 100 talents, but Phocion refused, saying: "I am an honorable man. I would not harm either Alexander's reputation or mine." Then, the king further offered him the government and possession of the cities Cius, Mylasa and Elaea. Phocion refused, but did request the release of some men enslaved at Sardis, who were promptly liberated. Soon afterward, Alexander died (323 BC). In 322 BC, Harpalus arrived at Athens from Asia, seeking refuge. He tried to give 700 talents to Phocion, who rejected this offer. Phocion warned that he shouldn't attempt to corrupt Athens or he would be punished. Consequently, the angry Harpalus turned the whole assembly against Phocion with his bribes. However, as Phocion kept helping him (with good will but within ethical limits), Harpalus befriended Phocion's son-in-law, Charicles. Charicles eventually accepted a lavish commission to build a tomb for Harpalus's mistress, and was investigated for corruption. Phocion refused to help him at the trial, saying: "I chose you to be my son-in-law only for honorable purposes." Phocion also refused presents from Menyllus, saying: "You are not a better man than Alexander, so there is no reason to accept your gifts." With his bribes, Menyllus then became a friend of Phocus.

== Appraisal ==
George Grote judged Phocion severely:

It was precisely during the fifty years of Phokion's political and military influence, that the Greeks were degraded from a state of freedom, and Athens from ascendency as well as freedom, into absolute servitude. Insofar as this great public misfortune can be imputed to any one man, to no one was it more ascribable than to Phokion... Had he lent his influence to... direct the armed efforts, of his countrymen, the kings of Macedon might have been kept within their own limits, and the future history of Greece might have been altogether different... he did gratuitously all that Philip desired — by nullifying and sneering down the efforts of Demosthenes... The intense and unanimous wrath of the people against him... was directed... against his public policy. It was the last protest of extinct Grecian freedom, speaking as it were from the tomb in a voice of thunder.

== See also ==
- Delian League
