= Lystra =

Historic settlement in Konya, Turkey

- Location within Turkey
- 37°36′07″N 32°20′18″E
- Type: Settlement
- Location: near modern Hatunsaray, Turkey
- Region: Lycaonia

Lystra (Ancient Greek: Λύστρα) was a city in central Anatolia, now part of present-day Turkey. It is mentioned six times in the New Testament. Lystra was visited several times by Paul the Apostle, along with Barnabas or Silas. There Paul met a young disciple, Timothy. Lystra was included by various authors in ancient Lycaonia, Isauria, or Galatia.

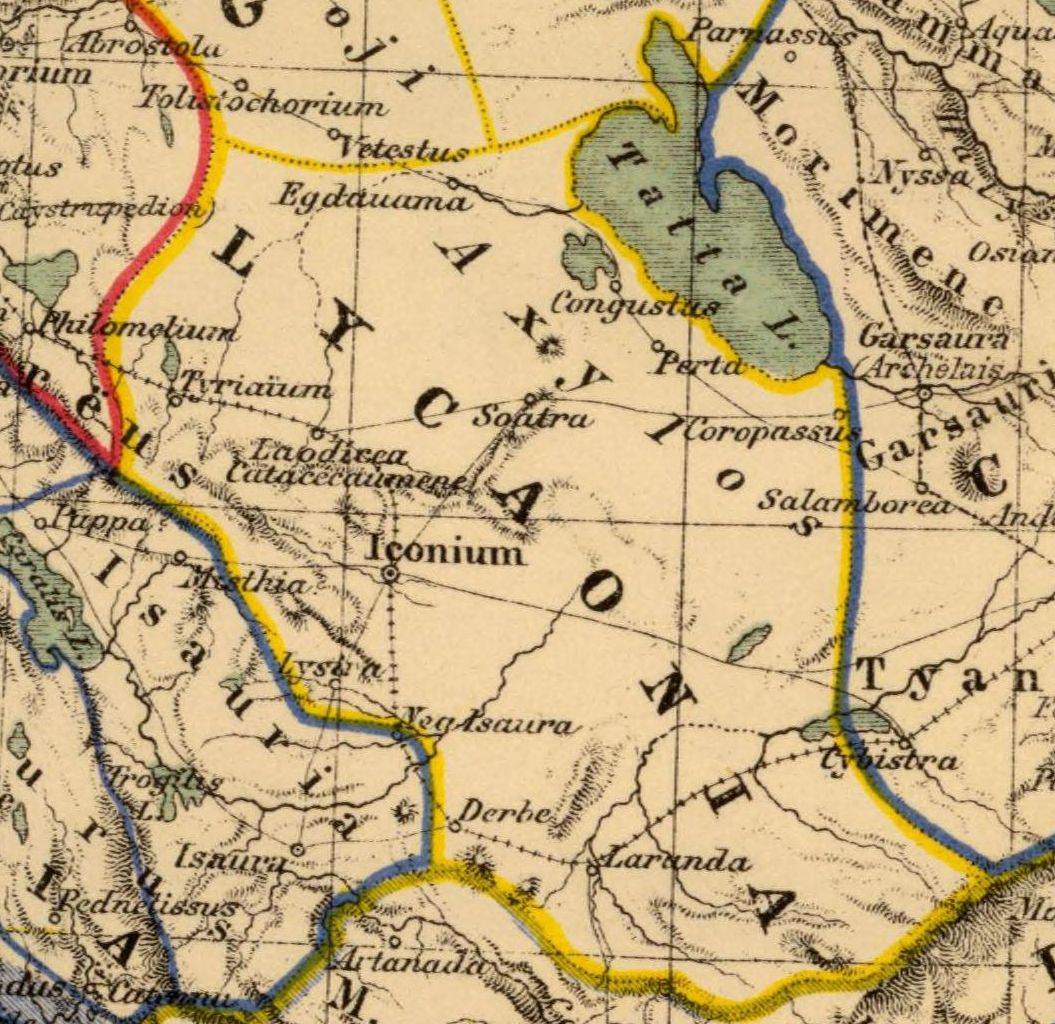
Heinrich Kiepert. Asia citerior. Lycaonia, 1903

== Location ==
The site of Lystra is believed to be located 30 kilometres (19 mi) south of the city of Konya (Iconium in the New Testament), north of the village of Hatunsaray and some 15 kilometres (9.3 mi) north of a small town called Akoren. A small museum within the village of Hatunsaray displays artifacts from ancient Lystra.

Lystra is the ancient name of the village visited by Paul the Apostle. There is a present-day village called "Kilistra" near Gökyurt, a village of the Meram district of Konya province. Ancient ruins can be seen near Klistra, including a church with a big cross marked on the wall, a winery, house-like buildings, and the ruins of a city located over the top of a hill which is locally called "Alusumas", where another church ruin can be seen. According to local people, the less-visible city was constructed over the hill to hide from enemies of ancient Anatolia. This site is still awaiting excavation.

Lystra is located on an ancient road which ran from Ephesus to Sardis to Antioch in Pisidia to Iconium and Lystra, to Derbe, through the Cilician Gates, to Tarsus, to Antioch in Syria, and then to points east and south.

== History ==
=== Classical Age ===
==== Roman period ====
The Roman Empire made Lystra a colony in 6 BC, under the name of Colonia Iulia Felix Gemina, possibly to gain better control of the tribes in the mountains to the west. Later, it was incorporated into the Roman province of Galatia, and soon afterwards the Romans built a road connecting Lystra to Iconium to the north.

Paul the Apostle visited here to preach the Christian gospel in 48 AD and again in 51 AD on his first and second missionary journeys, initially coming back after persecution drove him away from Iconium.

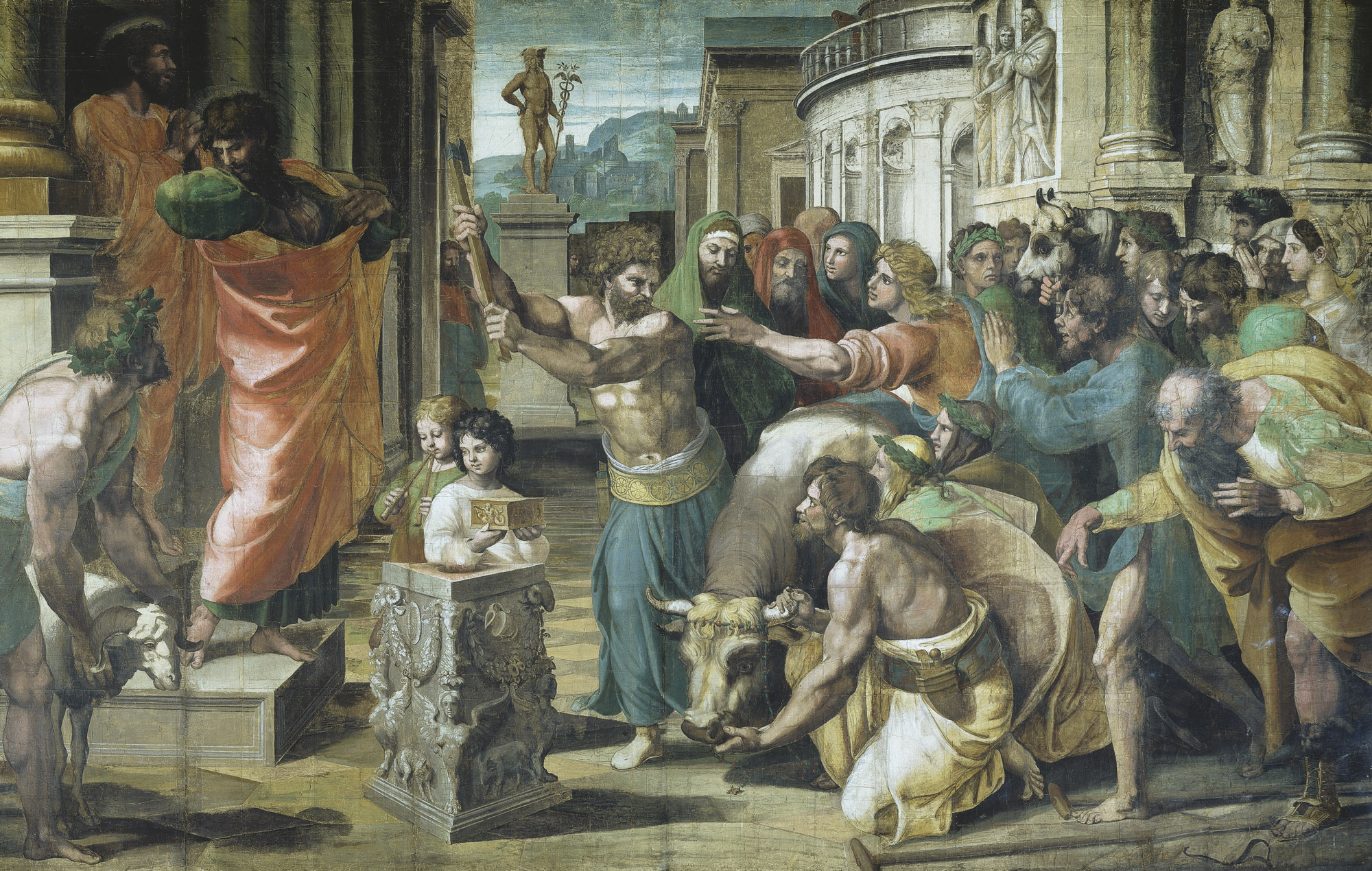
The Sacrifice at Lystra by Raphael, 1515.

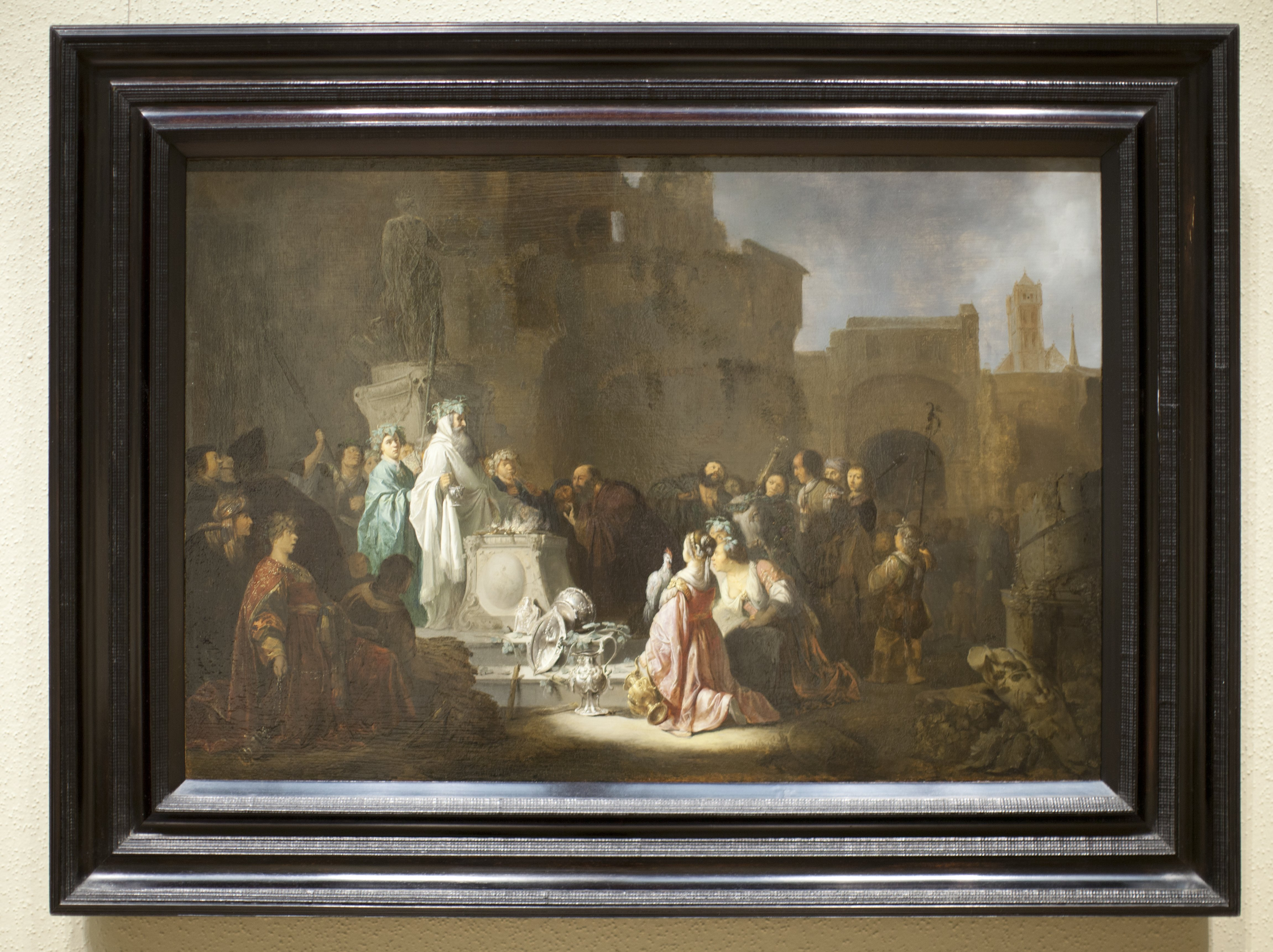
St. Paul and St. Barnabas at Lystra by Willem de Poorter, 1636

According to Acts 14:8–10, Paul healed a man who had been lame from birth. The man leaped up and began to walk and thus so impressed the crowd that they took Paul for Hermes, because he was the "chief speaker," and his companion Barnabas for Zeus. The crowd spoke in the local Lycaonian language and wanted to offer sacrifices to them, but Paul and Barnabas tore their clothes in dismay and shouted that they were merely men. They used this opportunity to tell the Lystrans of the Creator God citing 'the rain from heaven and fruitful seasons' as evidence of God's activity and generosity.

Soon, however, through the influence of the Jewish leaders from Antioch, Pisidia and Iconium, the Lystrans stoned Paul and left him for dead. As the disciples gathered around him, Paul stood on his feet and went back into the town. The next day, he and Barnabas left for Derbe; but on the return part of their journey, they stopped once more at Lystra, encouraging the disciples there to steadfastness.

Paul visited this city again on his second missionary tour. Timothy, a young disciple there, was probably among those who on the previous occasion at Lystra witnessed Paul's persecution and courage. Timothy left Lystra to become the companion of Paul and Silas on the rest of the Second Missionary Journey. It is also likely that Paul revisited Lystra near the beginning of his Third Missionary Journey.

Unlike other cities Paul visited, Lystra apparently had no synagogue, although Timothy's mother and grandmother were Jewesses, thus exposing him at an early age to the Holy Scriptures. Lystra appears to have been the first location where the apostles reached the Gentiles with the gospel of Christ without approaching them through the common ground of Judaism. Similar to his later approach in Athens, Paul introduces the Lystrans to God as their Creator and divine Benefactor. Theologian John Gill linked Paul's reference to 'the rain from heaven and fruitful seasons' to the words of the Jewish prophet Jeremiah: Do any of the worthless idols of the nations bring rain?

In Christian times Lystra had a bishop. It is included in the Roman Catholic Church's list of titular sees, the most recent titular bishop having been Bishop Enrique A. Angelelli Carletti in the 1960s, later Bishop of La Rioja, Argentina.

== Remains ==
Archaeologist and New Testament Scholar Sir William Mitchell Ramsay wrote in 1907: "Excavation at Lystra is urgently needed in the interests of history and New Testament study". He wrote in 1941: "One hopes that some enthusiast will spend the money needed to clear up the topography of Lystra; and some fragments, at present valueless, may be completed by his discoveries".
