= Derbe =

Ancient city

- Location within Turkey
- 37°20′57″N 33°21′42″E
- Location: Turkey
- Region: Karaman Province or Lycaonia

Derbe or Dervi (Greek: Δέρβη), also called Derveia (Greek: Δέρβεια), was a city of Galatia in Asia Minor, and later of Lycaonia, and still later of Isauria and Cappadocia. It is mentioned in the Acts of the Apostles at 14:6, 14:20, 16:1 and 20:4. Derbe is the only city mentioned in the New Testament where the inhabitants adopted Paul's version of Christianity right away.

== Etymology ==
Derbe is derived from Derbent which is derived from Persian "Darband" (Persian: دربند, lit. 'Barred gate', from dar "gate" + band "bar," lit. "barred gate"), referring to an adjacent pass, to a narrow gate entrance.

== Location ==
There may have been several cities with the name Derbe, since Derbe (meaning narrow gate or entrance) is mostly a geographical toponym (e.g. Derbent).

Strabo places Derbe "on the sides" of Isauria, and almost in Cappadocia. Elsewhere, he says it was in the eleventh praefecture of Cappadocia. When the apostles Paul and Barnabas visited Derbe, it was in Lycaonia. Stephanus of Byzantium places Derbe in Isauria.

In 1956, on the basis of an inscription dating to 157 AD, Michael Ballance fixed the site of Derbe at a mound known as Kerti Hüyük, some 15 miles (24 km) northeast of Karaman (ancient Laranda), near Ekinözü village in modern-day Turkey. Although subject to controversy, this is considered the most likely site.

Stephanus of Byzantium says that Derbe would have had a port (λιμήν, limēn), but this is an obvious mistake, as the city was located inland. This has been corrected to the form limnē (λίμνη, 'lake'], as there are some lakes in the vicinity, albeit a little further away. In modern Turkey there is a village named Derbent, nearby a lake and nearby Iconium city. There is also a district that is named Derbent.

== History ==
Antipater of Derbe, a friend of Cicero, was ruler of Derbe, but was killed by Amyntas of Galatia, who added Derbe to his possessions.

Claudioderbe was a special title given to Derbe during the reign of the Roman Emperor Claudius; it appears on second century coins from Derbe.

The apostles Paul and Barnabas came to Derbe after escaping a disturbance and surviving the stoning in Lystra (Acts 14:19), about 75 miles (120 km) away.

The Bishopric of Derbe became a suffragan see of Iconium. It is not mentioned by later Notitiae Episcopatuum. Just four bishops are known, from 381 to 672. Derbe is included in the Catholic Church's list of titular sees.

Saint Timothy was a native of Derbe (or of Lystra). Derve may also be linked to Dervish or Derviş (literally means mendicant, 'beggar', 'one who goes from door to door'), a mystic Sufi fraternity from Iconium whose most common practice Sama is directly associated with the 13th-century Persian mystic Rumi. The firstborn son of Rumi named Veled escaped death miraculously nearby Derbe (other sources report that it was the second son of Rumi that escaped death miraculously). The place where the miracle happened is mentioned as "Paul's cave" in Meyers Reisebücher. Maybe the dance named devr-i veledi that precedes the Sema ceremony is also related to Derve. According some rumors, Devr-i veledi (that was played during circumcision ceremonies) also refers to the circumcision of Rumi's father Bahā ud-Dīn Walad during the pilgrimage, and this action is somehow associated with the circumcision of Saint Timothy Acts 16:1–3.
