= Nicanor (Antipatrid general) =

Nicanor (/naɪˈkeɪnər/; Greek: Nικάνωρ Nīkā́nōr; executed 317 BC) was a Macedonian officer who served the Diadochus Cassander and the son in law of Aristotle. He campaigned on Cassander's behalf in Attica and Hellespont during the early Wars of the Diadochi, but was executed by Cassander after the latter suspected him of plotting a coup.

== Career ==
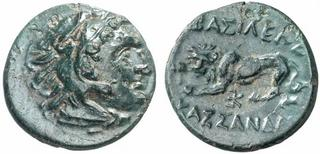
A stater of Cassander

According to A.B. Bosworth (Professor of Classics and Ancient History, The University of Western Australia), Nicanor was a son of Balacrus and Phila, making him both the son in law and adopted son of Aristotle. During the Olympic Games of 324 BC, Nicanor acted as the representative of Alexander the Great reading a proclamation that ordered Greek city states to welcome back people they had sent into exile.

During the Wars of the Diadochi, Nicanor served as an officer of Cassander who dispatched him immediately on the death of Antipater in 319 BC to replace Menyllus as commander of the Macedonian garrison at Munychia in Attica. He arrived to Athens shortly after the regent of the Macedon, Polyperchon, issued a decree blaming Antipater for the problems faced by the Greek city states and ordering the return of exiles who opposed him. The decree spurred many Athenians to get rid of the Macedonian garrison in Munychia and Nicanor. When Nicanor took part in an assembly of the Athenians in Piraeus, Athenian general Dercylus proposed arresting Nicanor but the latter's friend Phocion intervened on his behalf.

When the Ecclesia ordered Phocion to dislodge Nicanor from Munychia he delayed taking any action. Nicanor used this connections to begin negotiations with the Athenians, who demanded the withdrawal of the Macedonian garrison from Munychia, in line with the decree that had been issued by Polyperchon.

Nicanor deluded the Athenians with false hopes. Instead of surrendering Munychia, he took the opportunity to surprise the inhabitants of Piraeus, occupying it with a strong garrison. Nicanor declared his intention to hold both fortresses for Cassander. Alexander the Great's mother, Olympias, at this time on friendly terms with the regent, commanding Nicanor to withdraw his troops, but with no success. Similarly, Alexander, the son of Polyperchon, who arrived in Attica the following spring (318 BC), at the head of a considerable army, was ineffective in persuading Nicanor to withdraw from the fortresses. Polyperchon accused Phocion of being a traitor and he was sentenced to death along with his supporters in May 318 BC. After this one of Phocion's supporters, the later head of all of Athens, Demetrius of Phalerum, fled to Nicanor. An assault on Pireaus by Polyperchon was repelled.

Shortly afterwards, Cassander arrived with a fleet of ships given to him by his ally Antigonus, and Nicanor gave him possession of Piraeus and Munychia. Nicanor was quickly dispatched by Cassander with the fleet to the Hellespont, where he was joined by the forces of Antigonus, while Polyperchon was campaigning in the Peloponnese. In July 317 BC, Nicanor was defeated by Cleitus, Polyperchon's admiral, in a naval battle in the Bosporus. However, during the night Antigonus crossed the straits into Europe and at dawn attacked and destroyed Cleitus' army while Nicanor surprised the enemy fleet and also gained a complete victory by destroying or capturing almost all of the enemy's fleet (see: Battle of Byzantium). Polyperchon suffered another devastating defeat at Megalopolis and his allies began defecting to Cassander. Cassander captured Aegina, Salamina and the Panaktos fort, gradually encircling Athens. In the summer of 317 BC, the Athenians now under Demetrius of Phalerum allied themselves with Cassander.

== Death ==
After these events, Nicanor's influence grew to the extent that he incurred Cassander's suspicion that he was aiming to take power for himself. As a result, Cassander decided to rid himself of Nicanor. Cassander succeeded by treachery in capturing Nicanor. Cassander then arranged to have Nicanor put to death, after undergoing a form of trial before the Macedonian Army.
