= Lycaonia =

Ancient region in central Asia Minor, modern Turkey

Coordinates: 38°N 33°E

- Ancient Region of Anatolia
- Location: South-eastern Anatolia, Turkey
- State existed: Quasi-independent until c.200 BC
- Roman province: Cappadocia

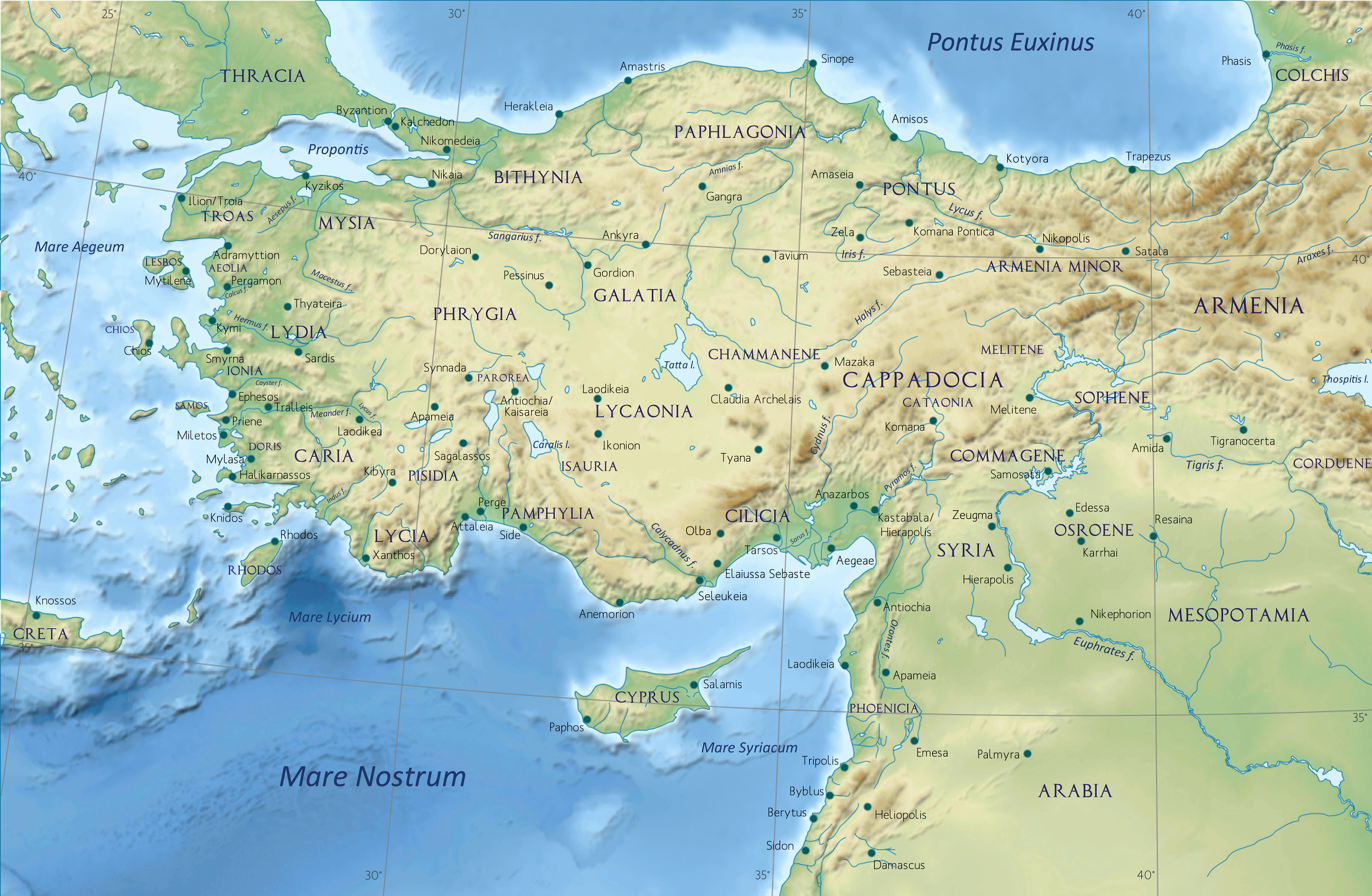

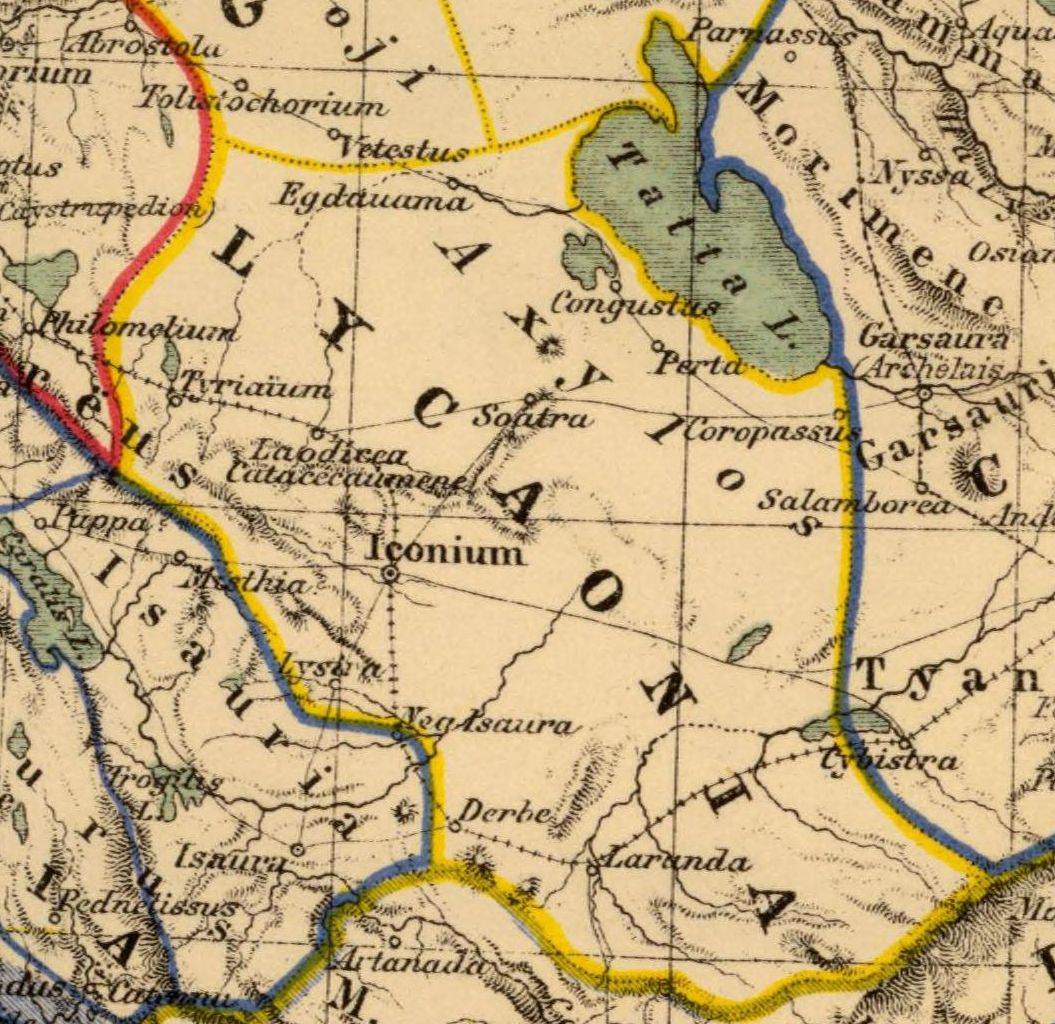
Heinrich Kiepert. Asia citerior. Lycaonia, 1903

Lycaonia (/ˌlɪkiˈoʊniə/; Greek: Λυκαονία, Lykaonia; Turkish: Likaonya) was a large region in the interior of Asia Minor (modern-day Turkey), north of the Taurus Mountains. It was bounded on the east by Cappadocia, on the north by Galatia, on the west by Phrygia and Pisidia, while to the south it extended to the chain of Mount Taurus, where it bordered on the country popularly called in earlier times Cilicia and in the Byzantine period Isauria; but its boundaries varied greatly at different times. The name is not found in Herodotus, but Lycaonia was mentioned by Xenophon as traversed by Cyrus the Younger on his march through Asia. That author described Iconium as the last city of Phrygia; and in Acts 14:6 Paul, after leaving Iconium, crossed the frontier and came to Lystra in Lycaonia. Ptolemy, on the other hand, included Lycaonia as a part of the province of Cappadocia, with which it was associated by the Romans for administrative purposes; but the two countries were clearly distinguished both by Strabo and Xenophon and by authorities generally.

== Etymology ==
There is a theory that the name "Lycaonia" is a Greek-adapted version (influenced by the Greek masculine name Lycaon) of an original Lukkawanna, which would mean "the land of the Lukka people" in an old Anatolian language related to Hittite.

== Geography ==
Lycaonia was described by Strabo as a cold region of elevated plains, affording pasture to wild asses and to sheep; and at the present day sheep abound, but asses are practically unknown. Amyntas, king of Galatia, to whom the district was for a time subject, maintained there not less than three hundred flocks. It forms part of the interior tableland of Asia Minor, and has an elevation of more than 1000 meters. It suffers from want of water, aggravated in some parts by abundance of salt in the soil, so that the northern portion, extending from near Iconium to the salt lake of Tatta and the frontiers of Galatia, is almost wholly barren, only small patches being cultivated near Iconium and the large villages. The soil, where water is supplied, is productive. In ancient times great attention was paid to storing and distributing the water, so that much land now barren was formerly cultivated and supported a large number of cities.

The plain is interrupted by some minor groups of mountains, of volcanic character, of which the Kara Dagh in the south, a few miles north of Karaman, rises to 2288 meters, while the Karadja Dagh, north-east of it, though of inferior elevation, presents a striking range of volcanic cones. The mountains in the north-west, near Iconium and Laodicea Combusta, are the termination of the Sultan Dagh range, which traverses a large part of Phrygia.

== History ==
The Lycaonians appear to have been in early times to a great extent independent of the Persian empire, and were like their neighbors the Isaurians a wild and lawless race of freebooters; but their country was traversed by one of the great natural lines of high road through Asia Minor, from Sardis and Ephesus to the Cilician gates, and a few considerable towns grew up along or near this line. The most important was Iconium, in the most fertile spot in the country, of which it was always regarded by the Romans as the capital, although ethnologically it was Phrygian. It is still called Konya, and it was the capital of the Seljuk Turkish sultane for several centuries. A little farther north, immediately on the frontier of Phrygia, stood Laodicea Combusta (Ladik), surnamed Combusta, to distinguish it from the Phrygian city of that name; and in the south, near the foot of Mount Taurus, was Laranda, now called Karaman, which has given name to the province of Karamania. Derbe and Lystra, which appear from the Acts of the Apostles to have been considerable towns, were between Iconium and Laranda. There were many other towns, which became bishoprics in Byzantine times. Lycaonia was Christianized very early; and its ecclesiastical system was more completely organized in its final form during the 4th century than that of any other region of Asia Minor.

Lycaonia was part of the Seleucid Empire but after the defeat of Antiochus the Great, it was given by the Romans to Eumenes II, king of Pergamon. About 160 BC, part of it, the Tetrarchy of Lycaonia, was added to Galatia; and in 129 BC the eastern half (usually called during the following 200 years Lycaonia proper) was given to Cappadocia as an eleventh strategia. In the readjustment of the Provinces, 64 BC, by Pompey after the Mithridatic Wars, he gave the northern part of the tetrarchy to Galatia and the eastern part of the eleventh strategia to Cappadocia. The remainder was attached to Cilicia. Its administration and grouping changed often under the Romans. In 371, Lycaonia was first formed into a separate province.

The ancient coinage of Lycaonia is quite limited. Judging from the number of types/issues known, coins appear to have been struck sporadically and perhaps mostly for prestige or some important occasion (like a visit by the Emperor).

The Lycaonians appear to have retained a distinct nationality in the time of Strabo, but their ethnical affinities are unknown. The mention of the Lycaonian language in the Acts of the Apostles (14:11) shows that the native language was spoken by the common people at Lystra about 50 AD; and probably it was only later and under Christian influence that Greek took its place. It is notable though that in the Acts of the Apostles Barnabas was called Zeus, and Paul was thought to be Hermes by Lycaonians, and this makes some other researchers to believe that Lycaonian language was actually a Greek dialect, the remnant of which can still be found in the Cappadocian Greek language which is classified as a distinct Greek dialect.

== Localities ==
- Zemruta

== See also ==
- Ancient regions of Anatolia

== Bibliography ==
- W. M. Ramsay, Historical Geography of Asia Minor (1890), Historical Commentary on Galatians (1899) and Cities of St Paul (1907)
- An article on the topography in the Jahreshefte des Oesterr. Archaeolog. Instituts, 194 (Beiblatt) pp. 57–132.
- Asia Minor Coins - Lycaonia Ancient Greek and Roman coins from Lycaonia
