= 322 BC =

322 BC in various calendars
| Gregorian calendar | 322 BC; CCCXXII BC |
| Ab urbe condita | 432 |
| Ancient Egypt era | XXXIII dynasty, 2 |
| Pharaoh | Ptolemy I Soter, 2 |
| Ancient Greek Olympiad (summer) | 114th Olympiad, year 3 |
| Assyrian calendar | 4429 |
| Balinese saka calendar | N/A |
| Bengali calendar | −915 – −914 |
| Berber calendar | 629 |
| Buddhist calendar | 223 |
| Burmese calendar | −959 |
| Byzantine calendar | 5187–5188 |
| Chinese calendar | 戊戌年 (Earth Dog); 2376 or 2169 — to — 己亥年 (Earth Pig); 2377 or 2170 |
| Coptic calendar | −605 – −604 |
| Discordian calendar | 845 |
| Ethiopian calendar | −329 – −328 |
| Hebrew calendar | 3439–3440 |
- Hindu calendars
| Vikram Samvat | −265 – −264 |
| Shaka Samvat | N/A |
| Kali Yuga | 2779–2780 |
| Holocene calendar | 9679 |
| Iranian calendar | 943 BP – 942 BP |
| Islamic calendar | 972 BH – 971 BH |
| Javanese calendar | N/A |
| Julian calendar | N/A |
| Korean calendar | 2012 |
| Minguo calendar | 2233 before ROC 民前2233年 |
| Nanakshahi calendar | −1789 |
| Thai solar calendar | 221–222 |
| Tibetan calendar | ས་ཕོ་ཁྱི་ལོ་ (male Earth-Dog) −195 or −576 or −1348 — to — ས་མོ་ཕག་ལོ་ (female Earth-Boar) −194 or −575 or −1347 |

Year 322 BC was a year of the pre-Julian Roman calendar. At the time, it was known as the Year of the Consulship of Rullianus and Curvus (or, less frequently, year 432 Ab urbe condita). The denomination 322 BC for this year has been used since the early medieval period, when the Anno Domini calendar era became the prevalent method in Europe for naming years.

== Events ==
=== By place ===
==== Greece ====
- Spring/summer – The Macedonian admiral Cleitus the White defeats the Athenian navy at the Battle of the Echinades and the Battle of Amorgos, ending Athenian thalassocracy in the Aegean.
- The Athenians and their allies' siege of the Macedonian ruler, Antipater, in Lamia is relieved by Leonnatus with an army of 20,000 infantry and 1,500 cavalry. Leonnatus is killed in the action.
- September 5 – Craterus arrives to defeat the Athenians in the Battle of Crannon. This battle marks a complete victory for Antipater in the Lamian War.
- The Athenian orator and diplomat, Demades, regains his citizenship so that he and Phocion can negotiate a peace with Antipater, thus concluding the Lamian War. Before setting out he persuades the citizens of Athens to pass the death sentence upon Demosthenes and his followers (including Hypereides, leader of the Athenian patriotic party). Demades' embassy results in a peace disadvantageous to the Athenians, with the Athenians forced to accept the occupation of Athens' port, Piraeus, by the Macedonians.
- Demosthenes flees from the Macedonians who demand his surrender. Upon being arrested, he takes poison and dies.
- Hypereides flees to Aegina only to be captured by the Macedonians at the temple of Poseidon and put to death.
- The League of Corinth is dissolved.

==== Egypt ====
- By custom, kings in Macedonia assert their right to the throne by burying their predecessor. To pre-empt Perdiccas, the imperial regent, Ptolemy has Alexander the Great's body brought to Memphis, Egypt and buried there in a gold sarcophagus. Ptolemy then marries Alexander's mistress, Thaïs and commences to reign as king of Egypt and the adjacent Libyan and Arabian regions.
- Ptolemy, taking advantage of internal disturbances, acquires the African Hellenic towns of Cyrenaica without the authority of Perdiccas.
- Ptolemy executes his deputy, Cleomenes of Naucratis, on the suspicion that Cleomenes favours Perdiccas. This action removes the chief check on his authority, and allows Ptolemy to obtain the sizable funds that Cleomenes has accumulated.

==== India ====
- Chandragupta Maurya captures Magadha: Chandragupta, with the help of Chanakya (Kautilya), who is also known as the Indian Machiavelli, destroys the Nanda rulers of Magadha and establishes the Maurya Empire. It is said that Chanakya met Chandragupta in the Vindhya forest, after being insulted by the Nanda king.

== Deaths ==
- October 12 – Demosthenes, Athenian statesman, recognized as the greatest of ancient Greek orators (b. 384 BC)
- Ariarathes I of Cappadocia, Achaemenid satrap, founder of the Iranian Ariarathid dynasty
- Aristotle, Greek philosopher and scientist (b. 384 BC)
- Cleomenes of Naucratis, Greek deputy to the Macedonian ruler of Egypt, Ptolemy
- Hypereides, Athenian orator (b. 390 BC)
- Leonnatus, Macedonian officer under Alexander the Great and one of the diadochi (b. 356 BC)
