= Athenian military =

Military forces of Athens in Ancient Greece

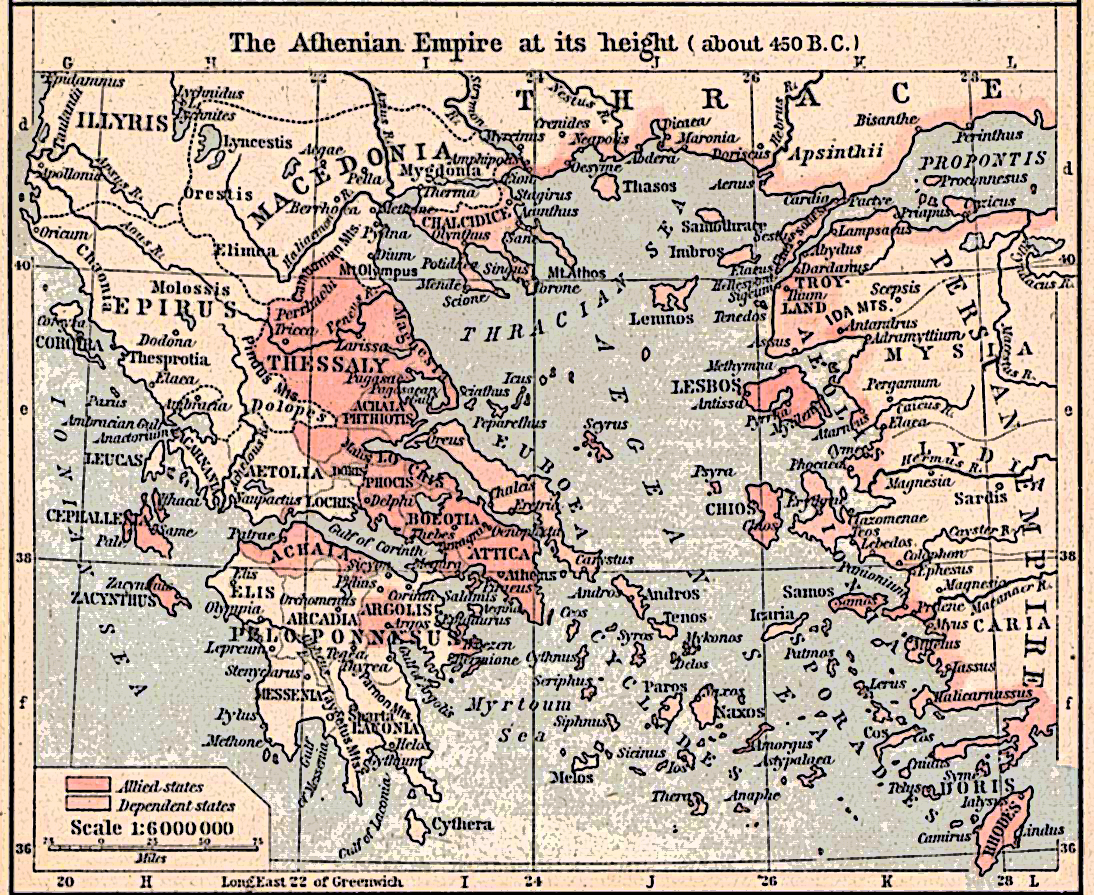
The Athenian Empire around 450 BC

The Athenian military was the main force of Athens, one of the major city-states (poleis) of Ancient Greece. It was largely similar to other armies of the region – see Ancient Greek warfare. Athens was mostly known for its navy, as a maritime power in the Mediterranean Sea.

== Athenian navy ==
=== Greco-Persian Wars and Athenian Empire ===
After discovering a rich vein of the Mines of Laurion, athenians used the money they got from selling silver, copper and lead (~100 talents), to make a fleet of 200 in 483 BC, beginning the history of the athenian navy.

During the Greco-Persian Wars, Athens defeated signifactly larger Achaemenid naval forces at the Battle of Salamis under Themistocles and then at the Battle of the Eurymedon under Cimon. The Athenian Navy consisted of 80,000 crewing 400 ships. The backbone of the navy's manpower was a core of professional rowers drawn from the lower classes of Athenian society. This gave the Athenian fleets an advantage in training over the less professional fleets of its rivals. The main warships of the fleet were the triremes. With its fleet, Athens obtained hegemony over the rest of the Greek city-states forming the Athenian Empire. Its fleet was destroyed and its empire lost during the Peloponnesian War. The fleet included two sacred ships, the Paralus and the Salaminia used for diplomatic and ceremonial duties.

=== Second Athenian league ===
Athens regained some of its naval power after the Second Athenian League was rebuilt; however, it never fully recovered as its rivals were much stronger than before. There is a possibility is that Iphicrates' reforms were limited to hoplites serving as marines on board ships of the Athenian navy.

=== Hellenistic period ===
In 322 BC during the Lamian war, although fallen from the height of its power during the Golden Age of Pericles in the 5th century, Athens still had extensive financial resources at its disposal and a fleet numbering 240 or perhaps even 400 warships.

== Major battles ==
- Battle of Ephesus (498 BC)
- Battle of Marathon
- Battle of Artemisium
- Battle of Salamis
- Battle of Plataea
- Battle of Mykale
- Battle of the Eurymedon
- Battle of Papremis (460 BC)
- Battles of Salamis-in-Cyprus
- Battle of Mantinea (418 BC)
- Sicilian Expedition
- Battle of Arginusae
- Battle of Aegospotami
- Battle of Lechaeum
- Battle of Mantinea (362 BC)
- Battle of Chaeronea (338 BC)
- Battle of Thermopylae (323 BC)
- Siege of Lamia
- Battle of Melitaea
- Battle of Crannon
- Battle of the Echinades (322 BC)
- Battle of Amorgos
- Siege of Athens (287 BC)
- Siege of Athens and Piraeus (87–86 BC)

== See also ==
- Phormio
- Sicilian expedition
- Scythian archers, possible military police employed by Athens
- Spartan army
- Macedon's army
- Hellenistic armies

== Sources ==
- This article incorporates text from A Day in Old Athens, by William Stearns Davis, a publication from 1910, now in the public domain in the United States.

Texts on Wikisource:

- Peace
- Hellenica
- Athenian Constitution
