= Battle of Thermopylae (323 BC) =

322 BCE battle

Coordinates: 38°48′19″N 22°33′46″E

- Part of Lamian War
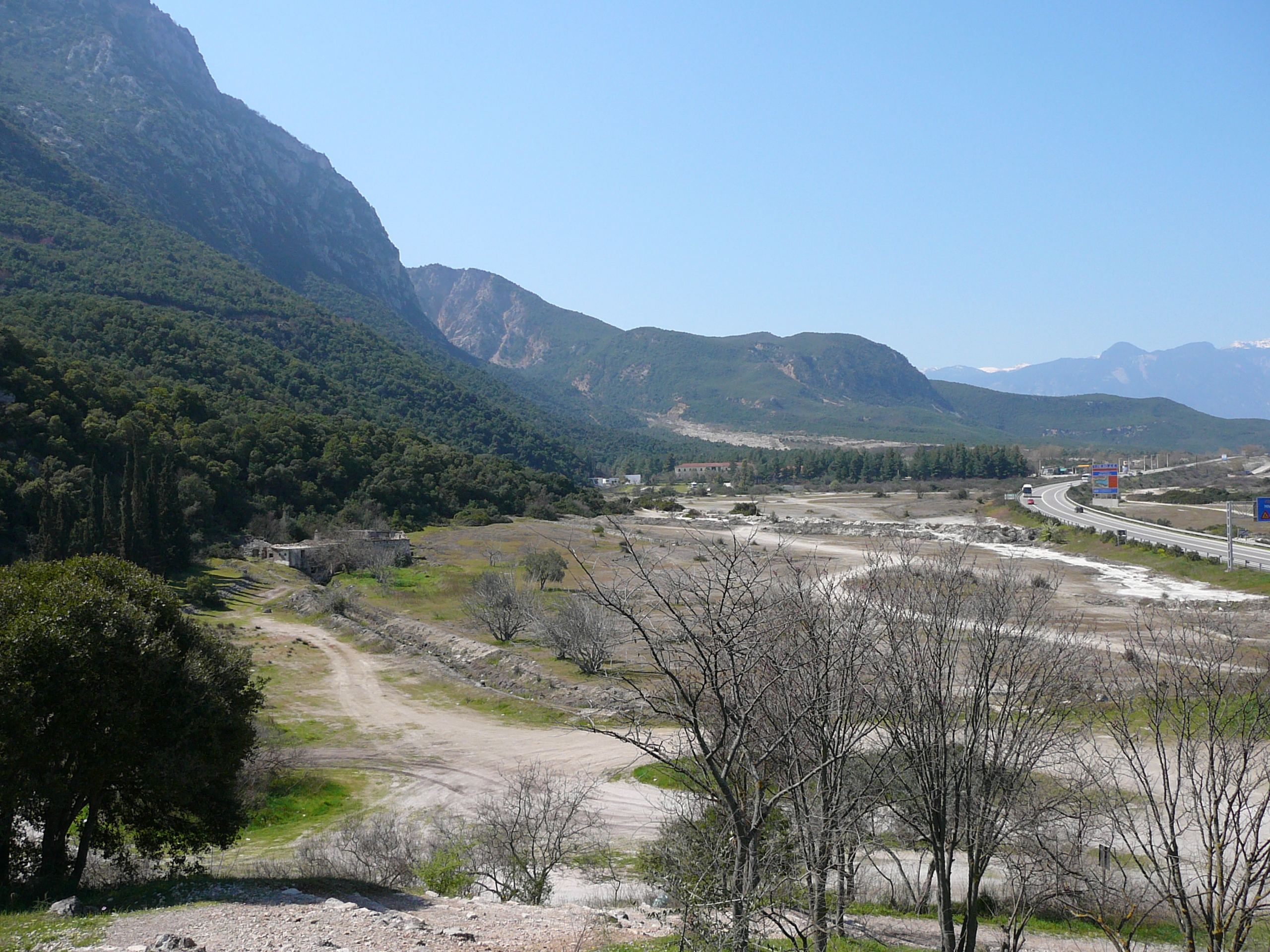
- The battlefield today
Date	323 BC
Location	Thermopylae
Result	Greek coalition victory

Belligerents
Athens; Aetolian League; Thessalian League	Macedonia

Commanders and leaders
Leosthenes; Menon	Antipatros

Strength
Unknown	13,000 infantry 600 cavalry

The Battle of Thermopylae was fought in 323 BC between the Macedonians and a coalition of armies including Athens and the Aetolian League in the pass of Thermopylae during the Lamian War.

== History ==
After Antipater received news of the outbreak of the war, he sent messengers to Craterus and Philotas who were in Asia with an army of over 10,000 soldiers, to come to his aid. But receiving news of the progress of the war and realizing that he could not wait for his reinforcements to arrive, he marched south to Thessaly with 13,000 foot soldiers and 600 horsemen, while he left Sippas in command of Macedon. But the Thessalians, who initially supported Macedon, changed sides to the Athenian alliance and joined the Athenian general Leosthenes' forces in occupying the passes of Thermopylae, significantly outnumbering the Macedonians. Antipater was defeated in the ensuing battle and since he could not retreat because the Athenian coalitions' forces were stronger than his forces, he shut himself in the city of Lamia where he was subsequently besieged by Leosthenes' forces.
