= Battle of Amorgos =

Naval battle of the Lamian War

- Part of the Lamian War
Date	May or June 322 BC
Location	Amorgos, Cyclades, Greece
Result	Macedonian victory

Belligerents
Athens	Macedonian empire

Commanders and leaders
Euetion	Kleitos

Strength
170 warships	240 warships

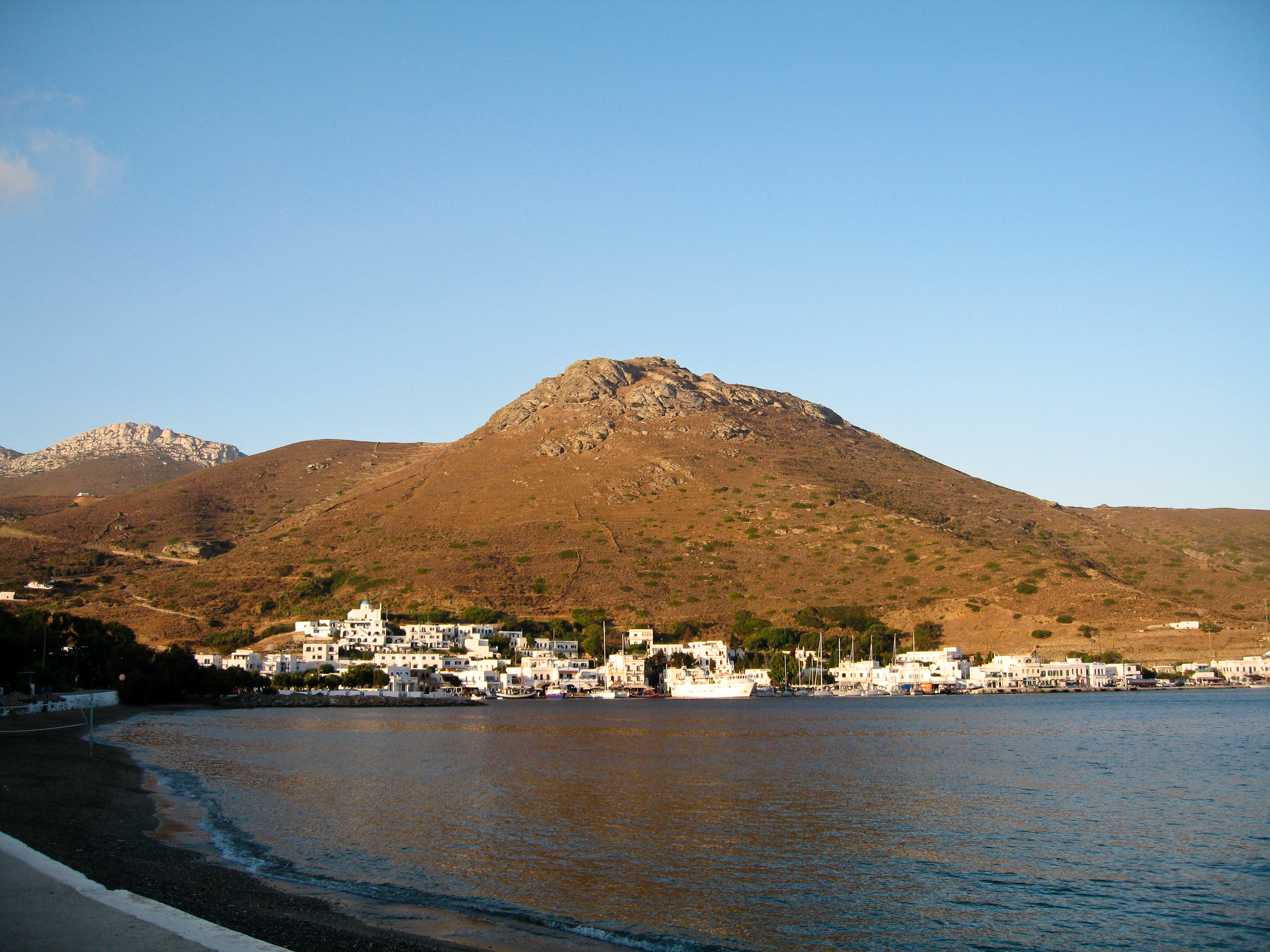
Katapola and Moundoulia hill, Amorgos Island, Greece

The Battle of Amorgos was one of the naval battles of the Lamian War (323–322 BC), fought between the Macedonian navy under Cleitus the White and the Athenian navy under Euetion. Although few details are known, it was a clear Athenian defeat, although the Athenians seem to have suffered few losses. Regarded as the decisive naval battle of the war, it signalled the end of Athenian thalassocracy and political independence.

== Background ==
The Lamian War or Hellenic War was a large-scale revolt of the Greek city-states of the League of Corinth against Macedonian authority following the death of Alexander the Great in 323 BC. The southern Greek city-states had never fully acquiesced to Macedonian hegemony, imposed through force of arms, but it was one of Alexander's last acts, the Exiles Decree of 324 BC, that provoked open resentment, especially in Athens, where preparations for war began even before Alexander's death. The Exiles Decree stipulated the return of all exiles and the restoration of their citizenship and property, and was perceived as a direct violation of the city-states' autonomy by Alexander. To the Athenians in particular, the decree was anathema as it meant that the island of Samos, an Athenian possession since 366 BC and settled with Athenian cleruchs, was to be restored to the exiled Samians. Instead of complying with it, they arrested the arriving Samian oligarchs and sent them as prisoners to Athens.

Although fallen from the height of its power during the Golden Age of Pericles in the 5th century, Athens still had extensive financial resources at its disposal and a fleet numbering 240 or perhaps even 400 warships. Following the news of Alexander's death, the Athenians played a leading role in assembling a league to fight for the restoration of the city-states' autonomy. The allies first defeated the pro-Macedonian Boeotians and then—aided by the defection of the Thessalian cavalry—the Macedonian viceroy of Greece, Antipater, forcing him to retreat to the fortified city of Lamia, where the allies laid siege to him. Antipater called for military and naval reinforcements from the rest of the Macedonian empire. As a result, while Antipater remained besieged in Lamia, a naval campaign was fought in the Aegean Sea between the Macedonians under Cleitus the White and the Athenians under Euetion, who initially attempted to stop the Macedonian reinforcements to cross from Asia Minor into Europe at the Hellespont.

== Historical sources and the battle ==
The two main sources on the naval battles of the Lamian War are Diodorus Siculus, and, to a lesser extent, Plutarch. Despite the decisive role of the naval battles in the war's outcome, the sources are brief and ambiguous as to the exact number and location of the naval battles fought. Diodorus Siculus (18.15.8–9) merely reports on the naval campaign that "Cleitus was in command of the Macedonian fleet, which numbered two hundred and forty. Engaging with the Athenian admiral Euetion he defeated him in two naval battles and destroyed a large number of the ships of the enemy near the islands that are called the Echinades". In addition, the Parian Marble, a chronicle inscribed on marble in Paros, refers to a battle near Amorgos, won by the Macedonians, while other inscriptions dated to ca. 320 BC refer to a battle at Abydos on the Hellespont.

It is unclear from Diodorus' statement whether there were two or three battles, which has led to several interpretations by modern researchers. The traditional reconstruction of events posits that there was a first battle at the Hellespont, per the inscriptions, that was won by the Macedonians, allowing their army to cross into Europe. This was followed by the Battle of Amorgos, and a third Battle of the Echinades, whose location is disputed by scholars. Some recent scholars follow the suggestions of A. B. Bosworth that Diodorus' passage did not summarize the entire naval campaign of the war, but referred to a separate naval theatre in the Ionian Sea, that was decided in two battles at the Echinades islands in spring 322. This would place the Battle of Amorgos after the battles at Echinades.

It is considered likely by many scholars that Cleitus, who headed the fleet stationed in the Levant, was not in command at the Hellespont. As a result, the battle of Amorgos may not have been a direct continuation of the Hellespont campaign, but rather indicate that Cleitus was confronted by the Athenians just as he was entering the Aegean from the southeast. This would also tally with Diodorus' statement that Cleitus only fought two battles, i.e. at Amorgos and the Echinades. Whatever the true course of events, it is clear that when the two fleets met, Cleitus with his 240 ships had a distinct numerical advantage over the Athenian fleet. Despite the full mobilization of their manpower, the Athenians could find enough crews for only about 170 warships, giving preference to manning the city's two quinqueremes and the available quadriremes, while the rest of the fleet was filled out with triremes.

According to the Parian Marble, the battle took place at the end of the archonship of Cephisodorus, hence in late May or June 322 BC—perhaps, according to N. G. Ashton, as late as 26 or 27 June. Little detail is known of the battle that is commonly described by scholars as the "decisive sea-battle of the Lamian War". The Athenians were clearly defeated, but their losses must not have been heavy: Plutarch derisively comments of Cleitus that he presented himself as Poseidon although he had sunk only three or four ships, and the Athenians were allowed to tow their wrecks back home, an unusual concession since the possession of the wrecks was usually the mark of victory. Indeed, the sight of the Athenian fleet rowing home towing wrecks was enough to send ahead to Athens the false message that its fleet had won a victory; the city celebrated for two or three days, before the fleet arrived and the truth became known. John R. Hale has proposed that the battle's curious outcome may have come about if Euetion issued a surrender just after the battle began, and gave assurances to Cleitus that Athens would no longer challenge Macedonia at sea. Such an act can be explained given the overwhelmingly negative stance to the war of the Athenian aristocracy, to which Euetion belonged, and which provided the fleet commanders and trierarchs.

== Aftermath ==
Although the bulk of the Athenian navy had escaped unscathed from Amorgos, it suffered heavy losses at the subsequent battle of Echinades, which most scholars place between Amorgos and the defeat of the allies on land at the Battle of Crannon in August. These successive defeats led the Athenians to seek peace. The terms saw the disenfranchisement and expulsion of 12,000 of the city's poorest citizens (the thetes) and the restriction of voting rights to the richer citizens, putting an end to Athenian democracy. In addition, Antipater installed a Macedonian garrison on the Munychia hill in the harbour of Piraeus, marking an end to both Athenian naval power and political independence.

The Battle of Amorgos is proposed by modern scholars as one of three possible naval battles—along with the Battle of Salamis (306 BC) and the Battle of Cos (261/255 BC)—that provided the occasion for the erection of the statue of the Nike of Samothrace.

== Sources ==
- Anson, Edward M. (2014). Alexander's Heirs: The Age of the Successors. John Wiley & Sons. ISBN 978-1-4443-3962-8.
- Ashton, N. G. (1977). "The Naumachia near Amorgos in 322 B.C.". The Annual of the British School at Athens. 72: 1–11. doi:10.1017/S0068245400005906. JSTOR 30103378.
- Bosworth, Albert Brian (2003). "Why Did Athens Lose the Lamian War?". In Palagia, Olga; Tracy, Stephen V. (eds.). The Macedonians in Athens, 322-229 B.C.: Proceedings of an International Conference Held at the University of Athens, May 24-26, 2001. Oxbow. pp. 14–22. ISBN 1-84217-092-9.
- Dixon, Michael D. (2014). Late Classical and Early Hellenistic Corinth: 338-196 BC. Routledge. ISBN 978-1-317-67649-2.
- Hackel, Waldemar (1992). The Marshals of Alexander's Empire. Routledge. ISBN 0-415-05053-7.
- Hale, John R. (2014). Lords of the Sea: The Epic Story of the Athenian Navy and the Birth of Democracy. Viking. ISBN 978-1-906142-78-0.
- Yardley, J. C.; Wheatley, Pat; Heckel, Waldemar, eds. (2011). Justin: Epitome of the Philippic History of Pompeius Trogus: Volume II: Books 13–15: The Successors to Alexander the Great. Oxford University Press. ISBN 978-0-19-927759-9.
