= Hypereides =

Athenian logographer (c. 390 – 322 BC)

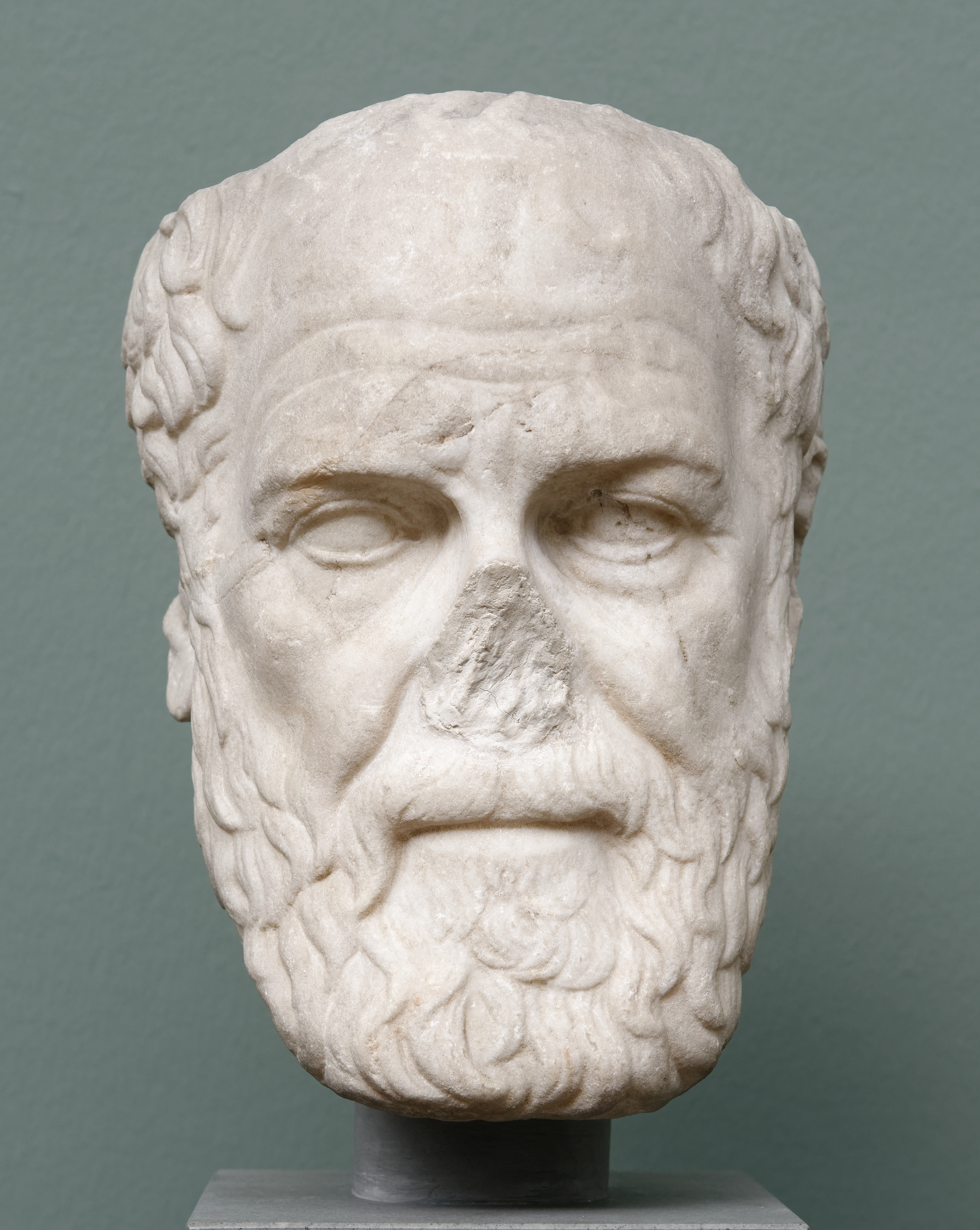
Roman copy of an anonymous Greek portrait type of the late 4th or early 3rd century BCE, often identified as Hypereides (Ny Carlsberg Glyptotek)

Hypereides or Hyperides (Ancient Greek: Ὑπερείδης, Hypereidēs; c. 390 – 322 BC; English pronunciation with the stress variably on the penultimate or antepenultimate syllable) was an Athenian logographer (speech writer). He was one of the ten Attic orators included in the "Alexandrian canon" compiled by Aristophanes of Byzantium and Aristarchus of Samothrace in the third century BC.

He was a leader of the Athenian resistance to King Philip II of Macedon and Alexander the Great. He was associated with Lycurgus and Demosthenes in exposing pro-Macedonian sympathizers. He is known for prosecuting Philippides of Paiania for his pro-Macedonian measures and his decree in honoring Alexander the Great.

== Rise to power ==
Little is known about his early life except that he was the son of Glaucippus of the deme of Collytus and that he studied logography under Isocrates. In 360 BC, he prosecuted Autocles for treason. During the Social War (358–355 BC) he accused Aristophon, then one of the most influential men at Athens, of malpractices, and impeached Philocrates (343 BC) for high treason. Although Hypereides supported Demosthenes in the struggle against Philip II of Macedon; that support was withdrawn after the Harpalus affair. After Demosthenes' exile Hypereides became the head of the patriotic party (324 BC).

== Downfall ==
After the death of Alexander the Great, Hypereides was one of the chief promoters of war against Macedonian rule. His speeches are believed to have led to the outbreak of the Lamian War (323–322 BC) in which Athens, Aetolia, and Thessaly revolted against Macedonian rule. After the decisive defeat at Crannon (322 BC) in which Athens and her allies lost their independence, Hypereides and the other orators were captured by Archias of Thurii and condemned to death by the Athenian supporters of Macedon.

Hypereides fled to Aegina only to be captured at the temple of Poseidon. After being put to death, his body (according to others) was taken to Cleonae and shown to the Macedonian general Antipater before being returned to Athens for burial.

== Personality and oratorical style ==
Hypereides was an ardent pursuer of "the beautiful," which in his time generally meant pleasure and luxury. He was a flamboyant figure, unwavering in public in his hostility to Macedon. He was a well-known epicure given to fine food and women. He engaged in countless affairs with prostitutes, some of whom he defended in court. His temper was easy-going and humorous. Though in his development of the periodic sentence he followed Isocrates, the essential tendencies of his style are those of Lysias. His diction was plain, though he occasionally indulged in long compound words probably borrowed from Middle Comedy. His composition was simple. He was especially distinguished for subtlety of expression, grace and wit. Hypereides is known to have owned at least two or three pieces of property: an estate in Eleusis, a house in Athens, and a house in Piraeus, where he kept one of his many women. In around 340 BC he is known to have performed only two public services, as trierarch and Chorus producer. It is said he had received money from the Persian King who was alarmed at Macedon's expansion.

== Surviving speeches ==
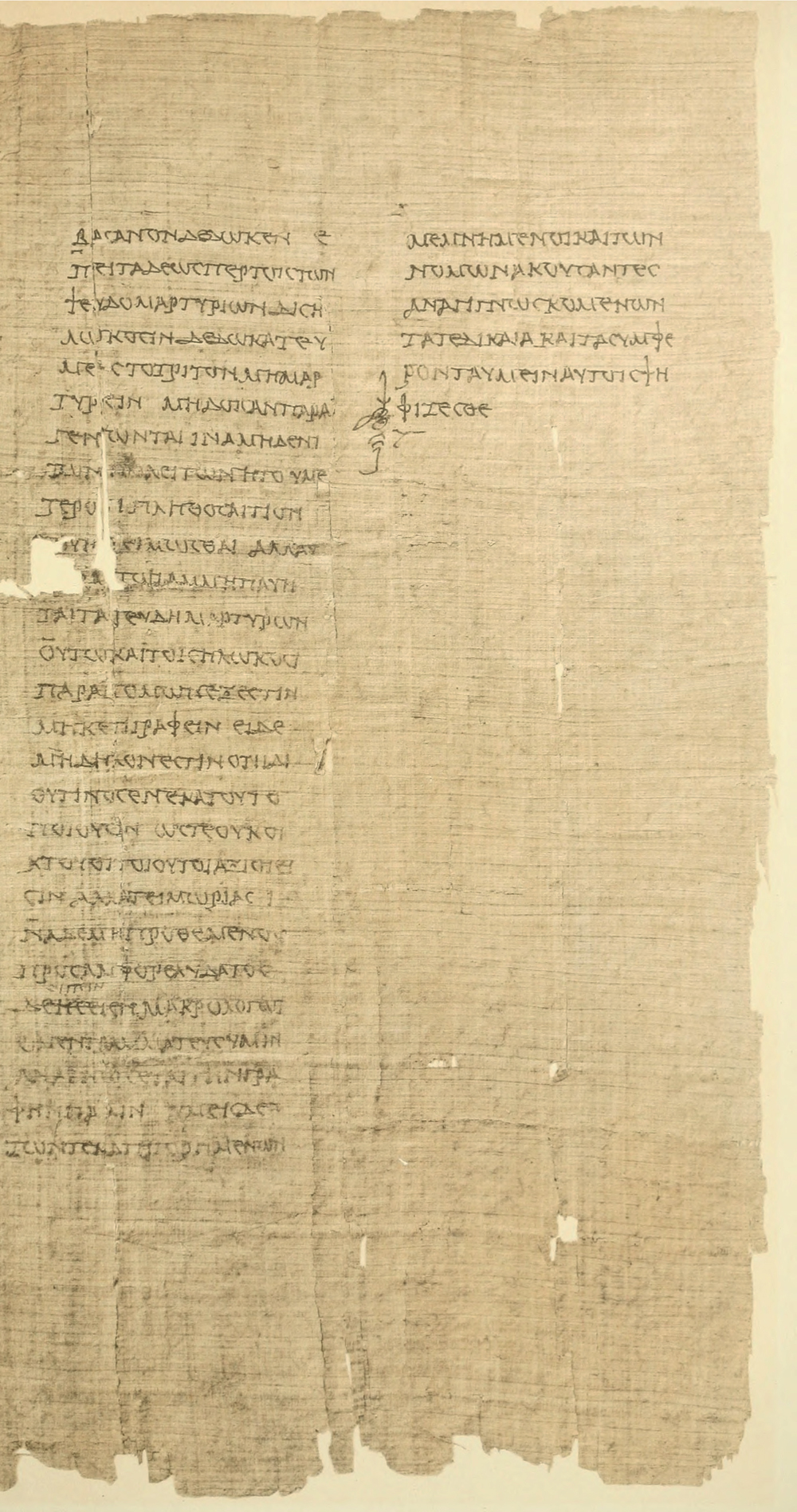
The final two columns of P.Lit.Lond. 134, the 2nd-century BC papyrus that transmits the conclusion to Against Philippides

Hypereides's speech in trial against Philippides lasted over thirty minutes. In the first speech against Philippides he attacked King Philip II of Macedon and Alexander the Great. In the second part of the papyrus, he attacks Philippides and his associates and states: Each one of them was a traitor, one in Thebes, another in Tanagra, another in Eleutherae, doing everything in the service of the Macedonians. He pleaded Philip's cause and campaigned with him against our country which is his most serious offense. Hypereides detested Philippides pro-Macedonian sympathies. Hypereides exposed Philippides who was known as saying in the Assembly: We must honor Alexander for all those that died at his hand. Seventy-seven speeches have been attributed to Hypereides, of which twenty-five were regarded as spurious by his contemporaries. It is said that a manuscript of most of the speeches survived as late as the 15th century in the Bibliotheca Corviniana, library of Matthias Corvinus, king of Hungary, but was later destroyed after the capture of Buda by the Turks in the 16th century. Only a few fragments were known until relatively recent times. In 1847, large fragments of his speeches, Against Demosthenes and For Lycophron (incidentally interesting for clarifying the order of marriage processions and other details of Athenian life, and the Athenian government of Lemnos) and the whole of For Euxenippus (c. 330 BC, a locus classicus on εἰσαγγελίαι eisangeliai or state prosecutions), were found in a tomb at Thebes in Egypt. In 1856 a considerable portion of a logos epitaphios, a Funeral Oration over Leosthenes and his comrades who had fallen in the Lamian war was discovered.

Towards the end of the nineteenth century further discoveries were made including the conclusion of the speech Against Philippides (dealing with an indictment for the proposal of unconstitutional measure, arising out of the disputes of the Macedonian and anti-Macedonian parties at Athens), and of the whole of Against Athenogenes (a perfumer accused of fraud in the sale of his business).

=== New discoveries ===
In 2002 Natalie Tchernetska of Trinity College, Cambridge discovered fragments of two speeches of Hypereides, which had been considered lost, in the Archimedes Palimpsest. These were from two new speeches, the Against Timander and Against Diondas, increasing the quantity of material known by this author by 20 percent. Tchernetska's discovery led to a publication on the subject in the Zeitschrift für Papyrologie und Epigraphik. This prompted the establishment of a working group under the auspices of the British Academy, which includes scholars from the UK, Hungary and the US.

In 2006, the Archimedes Palimpsest project together with imagers at Stanford University used powerful X-ray fluorescence imaging to read the final pages of the Palimpsest, which contained the material by Hypereides. These were interpreted, transcribed and translated by the working group.

In 2018 a passage of another speech of Hypereides (Against the envoys of Antipater) was discovered in a papyrus from Herculaneum.

== Lost speeches ==
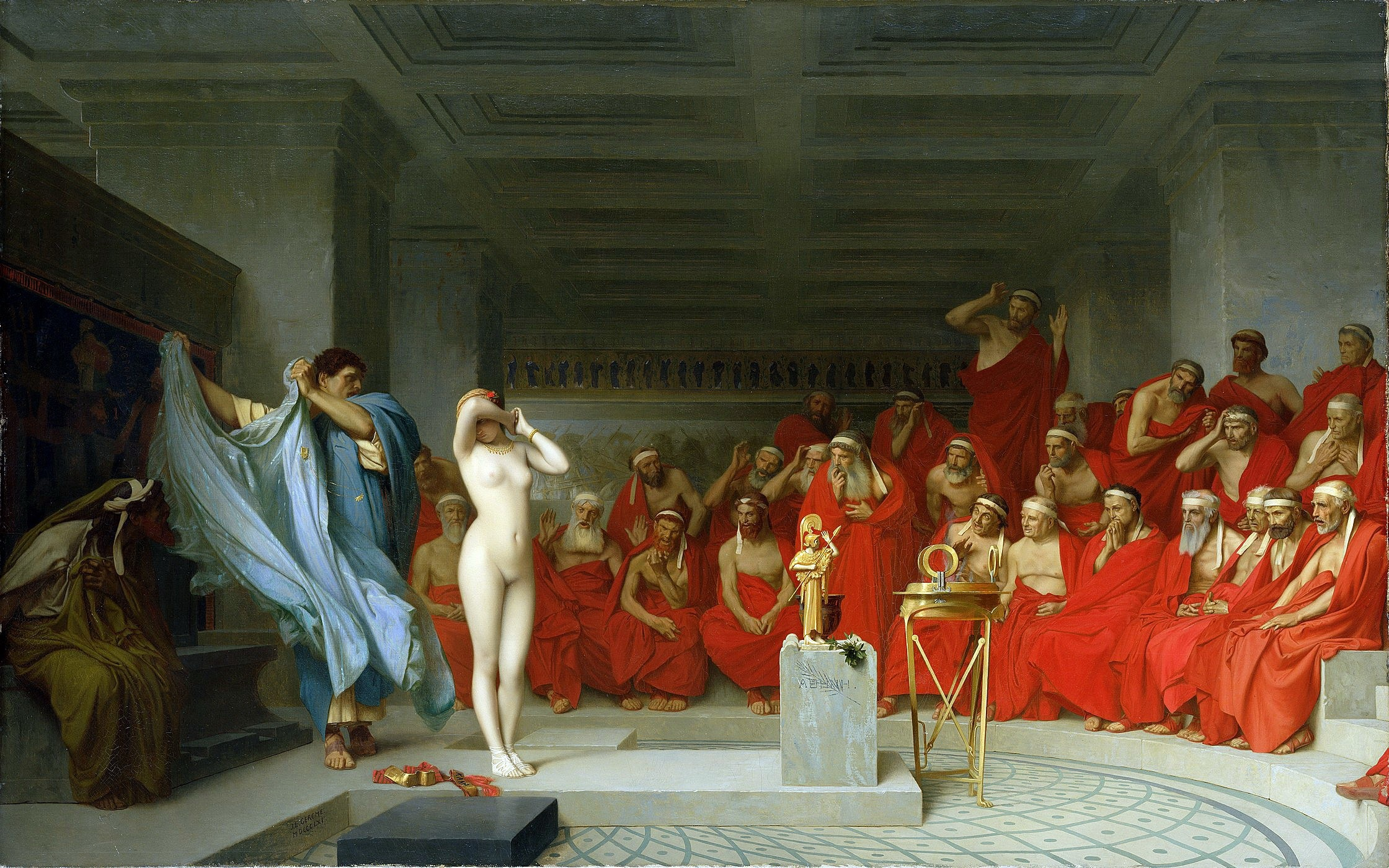
Jean-Léon Gérôme, Phryne before the Areopagus, 1861

Among the speeches not yet recovered is the Deliacus in which the presidency of the Temple of the Delians claimed by both Athens and Cos, which was adjudged by the Amphictyonic League to Athens. Also missing is the speech in which he defended the illustrious courtesan Phryne (said to have been his mistress) on a capital charge: according to Plutarch and Athenaeus the speech climaxed with Hypereides stripping off her clothing to reveal her naked breasts; in the face of which the judges found it impossible to condemn her.

== Portraits ==
Portraits of Hypereides are known to have existed in antiquity: a papyrus fragment from Egypt records that the Athenians honored him with statues after their liberation from Demetrius of Phalerum in 307 BCE, and an inscribed base, once in the Villa Mattei in Rome but now lost, bore a statue of Hyperides signed by the artist Zeuxiades. No inscribed portrait of Hypereides survives, however, and no existing ancient portrait type can be securely identified with him. In 1913, Frederik Poulsen suggested that a double herm of the Roman period in the Musée Vivenel in Compiègne, which bears a portrait of a bearded man on one side and a portrait of a woman on the other, represented Hypereides and Phryne; as a result, the male portrait type, which exists in at least half a dozen Roman versions, is now commonly referred to as Hypereides. The style of the portrait that lies behind these copies seems to fit the late 4th or early 3rd century BCE. Poulsen's argument has not been universally accepted, however, and critics have described it as "dubious" and "speculative".

== Assessment ==
William Noel, the curator of manuscripts and rare books at the Walters Art Museum in Baltimore, Maryland and the director of the Archimedes Palimpsest project, called Hypereides "one of the great foundational figures of Greek democracy and the golden age of Athenian democracy, the foundational democracy of all democracy."

== See also ==
- Churchill Babington
- Phryne

== Bibliography ==
Editions

- Hyperidis orationes sex cum ceterarum fragmentis, Friedrich Blass (ed.), 2nd edition, Lipsiae, in aedibus B. G. Teubneri, 1881.
- Hyperidis orationes sex cum ceterarum fragmentis, Friedrich Blass (ed.), 3rd edition, Lipsiae, in aedibus B. G. Teubneri, 1894.
- Whitehead, David (2000). Hypereides: The Forensic Speeches. Oxford University Press. ISBN 0-19-815218-3.
- Herrman, Judson (ed., trans. comm.). Hyperides. Funeral oration. Oxford, Oxford University Press, 2009. xiv, 148 p. (American Philological Association. American Classical Studies, 53).
- Horváth, László (2015). Der "Neue Hypereides". Textedition, Studien und Erläuterungen [The 'New Hypereides'. Text edition, studies and explanations]. Texte und Kommentare, vol. 50. Berlin: De Gruyter, ISBN 9783110378627.

Studies

- Engels, Johannes (1989). Studien zur politischen Biographie des Hypereides. Athen in der Epoche der lykurgischen Reformen und des makedonischen Universalreiches [Studies on the political biography of Hypereides. Athens in the Era of the Lycurgical Reforms and the Macedonian Universal Empire]. Munich: tuduv, ISBN 3-88073-295-7.
