= Battle of the Echinades (322 BC) =

Naval battle of the Lamian War

- Part of the Lamian War
Date	Spring or Summer 322 BC
Location	Echinades islands or off the Malian Gulf
Result	Macedonian victory

Belligerents
Athens	Macedonian empire

Commanders and leaders
Euetion	Kleitos

The Battle of the Echinades was one of the naval battles of the Lamian War (323–322 BC), fought between the Macedonian navy under Cleitus the White and the Athenian navy.

== Background ==
The Lamian War or Hellenic War was fought by a coalition of cities including Athens and the Aetolian League against Macedon following the death of Alexander the Great in 323 BC. The southern Greek city-states had never fully acquiesced to Macedonian hegemony, imposed through force of arms, but it was one of Alexander's last acts, the Exiles Decree of 324 BC that provoked open resentment, especially in Athens, where preparations for war began even before Alexander's death. The Exiles Decree stipulated the return of all exiles and the restoration of their citizenship and property, and was perceived as a direct violation of the city-states' autonomy by Alexander. To the Athenians in particular, the decree was anathema as it meant that the island of Samos, an Athenian possession since 366 BC and settled with Athenian cleruchs, was to be restored to the exiled Samians. Instead of complying with it, they arrested the arriving Samian oligarchs and sent them prisoner to Athens.

Although fallen from the height of its power during the Golden Age of Pericles in the 5th century, Athens still had extensive financial resources at its disposal and a fleet numbering 240 or perhaps even 400 warships. Following the news of Alexander's death, the Athenians played a leading role in assembling a league to fight for the restoration of the city-states' autonomy. The allies first defeated the pro-Macedonian Boeotians and then—aided by the defection of the Thessalian cavalry—the Macedonian viceroy of Greece, Antipater, forcing him to retreat to the fortified city of Lamia, where the allies laid siege to him. Antipater called for military and naval reinforcements from the rest of the Macedonian empire. As a result, while Antipater remained besieged in Lamia, a naval campaign was fought in the Aegean Sea between the Macedonians under Cleitus the White and the Athenians under Euetion, who initially attempted to stop the Macedonian reinforcements to cross from Asia Minor into Europe at the Hellespont.

== Historical sources and localization of the battle ==
The two main sources on the naval battles of the Lamian War are Diodorus Siculus, and, to a lesser extent, Plutarch. Despite the decisive role of the naval battles in the war's outcome, the sources are brief and ambiguous as to the exact number and location of the naval battles fought. Diodorus Siculus (18.15.8–9) merely reports on the naval campaign that "Cleitus was in command of the Macedonian fleet, which numbered two hundred and forty. Engaging with the Athenian admiral Euetion he defeated him in two naval battles and destroyed a large number of the ships of the enemy near the islands that are called the Echinades". In addition, the Parian Marble, a chronicle inscribed on marble in Paros, refers to a battle near Amorgos, won by the Macedonians, while other inscriptions dated to ca. 320 BC refer to a battle at Abydos on the Hellespont.

It is unclear from Diodorus' statement whether there were two or three battles, which has led to several interpretations by modern researchers. The traditional reconstruction of events posits that there was a first battle at the Hellespont, per the inscriptions, that was won by the Macedonians, allowing their army to cross into Europe. This was followed by the Battle of Amorgos, and a third battle at the Echinades. An additional problem arises form the fact that the Echinades islands are in the Ionian Sea, off the western coast of Greece, which is incompatible with a war fought mainly in the Aegean Sea and along the eastern coast of Greece. Hence it has been suggested by T. Walek (Revue de Philologie 48, 1924, pp. 28ff.) that the islands in question were the Lichades in the Malian Gulf near Lamia, while J. S. Morrison (The Journal of Hellenic Studies 107, 1987, p. 95) suggested that the site of the battle was at the islets near Cape Echinus.

More recently, however, A. B. Bosworth suggested that Diodorus' passage did not summarize the entire naval campaign of the war, but referred to a separate naval theatre in the Ionian Sea, most likely against the Aetolians who claimed possession of Oiniades at the Acarnanian coast. Bosworth posited that the Athenians sent a fleet to aid the Aetolians, and that there were indeed two battles near the Echinades in spring 322, in which the Athenians were defeated. The Macedonian fleet then returned to the Aegean, where it confronted and defeated the last Athenian navy at Amorgos. This view has found increasing acceptance among scholars in recent works, although John R. Hale for instance retains the traditional chronology of the battles, placing Amorgos before the Echinades. Other historians, like Edward M. Anson, remain sceptical and prefer the traditional interpretation, locating the "Echinades" near the Malian Gulf and placing the battle after Amorgos as well.

Whatever the true location, Diodorus emphasizes the losses suffered by the Athenians at Echinades. Consequently, the scholars who place the battle after Amorgos regard it as the coup de grâce to the Athenian navy, which had survived Amorgos mostly unscathed.

== Aftermath ==
The successive naval defeats, coupled with the arrival of Macedonian reinforcements and the defeat of the southern Greek allies at the Battle of Crannon on land, led the Athenians to seek peace. The terms saw the disenfranchisement and expulsion of 12,000 of the city's poorest citizens (the thetes) and the restriction of voting rights to the richer citizens, putting an end to classical Athenian democracy. In addition, Antipater installed a Macedonian garrison on the Munychia hill in Piraeus, marking an end to Athenian naval power and political independence.

== Sources ==
- Anson, Edward M. (2014). Alexander's Heirs: The Age of the Successors. John Wiley & Sons. ISBN 978-1-4443-3962-8.
- Bosworth, Albert Brian (2003). "Why Did Athens Lose the Lamian War?". In Palagia, Olga; Tracy, Stephen V. (eds.). The Macedonians in Athens, 322-229 B.C.: Proceedings of an International Conference Held at the University of Athens, May 24-26, 2001. Oxbow. pp. 14–22. ISBN 1-84217-092-9.
- Dixon, Michael D. (2014). Late Classical and Early Hellenistic Corinth: 338-196 BC. Routledge. ISBN 978-1-317-67649-2.
- Hackel, Waldemar (1992). The Marshals of Alexander's Empire. Routledge. ISBN 0-415-05053-7.
- Hale, John R. (2014). Lords of the Sea: The Epic Story of the Athenian Navy and the Birth of Democracy. Viking. ISBN 978-1-906142-78-0.
- Yardley, J. C.; Wheatley, Pat; Heckel, Waldemar, eds. (2011). Justin: Epitome of the Philippic History of Pompeius Trogus: Volume II: Books 13-15: The Successors to Alexander the Great. Oxford University Press. ISBN 978-0-19-927759-9.
