= Hellespontophylakes =

Hellespontophylakes (Ancient Greek: Ἑλλησποντοφύλακες, "Guards of the Hellespont") were Athenian grain officials in Classical Greece responsible for overseeing the passage of grain from the Euxine Sea (Black Sea) to the Aegean and Athens. Leveraging the power of the Athenian navy, they could deny any and all other state's access to the Euxine Sea.
