= Menon IV of Pharsalus =

Ancient Greek nobleman, maternal grandfather of Pyrrhus of Epirus

Menon (Ancient Greek: Μένων; died 321 BC) was a citizen of Pharsalus in Thessaly, and a man of great influence and reputation. He took a prominent part in the Lamian war, and commanded the Thessalian cavalry in the Battle of Melitaea.

Plutarch states that Menon's services were highly valued by the confederates, and that he held a place in their estimation second only to Leosthenes. At the Battle of Crannon (322 BC), he and Antiphilus the Athenian, were defeated by Antipater and Craterus, though the Thessalian horse under his command maintained its superiority over that of the enemy during the action. Menon and Antiphilus then felt compelled to open negotiations with the conquerors, which led to the dissolution of the Greek confederacy.

When Antipater was obliged to cross over to Asia to take on Perdiccas, the Aetolians renewed the war, and were zealously supported in Thessaly by Menon, through whose influence it was probable that most of the Thessalian towns were induced to take part in the insurrection. However, soon after, in 321 BC, Menon was defeated by Polyperchon in a pitched battle, during which Menon was slain.

Menon had given his daughter, Phthia, in marriage to Aeacides, king of Epirus, by whom she became the mother of Pyrrhus.
