= Battle of the Echinades =

Battle of the Echinades can refer to:

- Battle of the Echinades (322 BC), fought between the Athenian and Macedonian navies
- Battle of the Echinades (1427), fought between the Byzantines and the fleet of Carlo I Tocco
