= Cleitus the White =

4th-century BCE soldier, officer of Alexander the Great

Cleitus (Clitus) the White (Ancient Greek: Κλεῖτος ὁ λευκός; died c. 317 BC) was an officer of Alexander the Great surnamed "White" to distinguish him from Cleitus the Black. He is noted by Athenaeus and Aelian for his pomp and luxury, and is probably the same who is mentioned by Justin among the veterans sent home to Macedonia under Craterus in 324 BC.

== Life ==
After Alexander's death he reappears as commander of the Macedonian fleet for Antipater in the Lamian War in 323 BC, and defeated the Athenian admiral, Euetion, in the Battle of Amorgos. He then went on to defeat the Athenian fleet a second time in the Battle of the Echinades. These defeats signalled the end of Athenian thalassocracy, and were decisive in the Macedonian victory in the war. In the distribution of provinces at Triparadisus in 321 BC, he obtained from Antipater (the new regent of the Empire) the satrapy of Lydia.

=== Wars of the Diadochi ===
In 318 BC, at the start of the Second War of the Diadochi, Antigonus advanced against him from Phrygia; Cleitus garrisoned the principal cities, and sailed away to Macedonia to report the state of affairs to Polyperchon (who had become regent after Antipater's death). After Polyperchon had been baffled at Megalopolis, he sent Cleitus with a fleet to the Hellespont to prevent any forces of Antigonus from passing into Europe, and also to effect a junction with Arrhidaeus, the satrap of Hellespontine Phrygia, who had shut himself up in the town of Cius. In 317 BC, Nicanor was sent against him by Antigonus and Cassander, a battle ensued near Byzantium, in which Cleitus gained a decisive victory. But his success rendered him overconfident, and, having allowed his troops to disembark and encamp on land, he was surprised by Antigonus and Nicanor, and lost all his ships except the one in which he sailed himself. Having reached the shore in safety, he proceeded towards Macedonia, but was slain by some soldiers of Lysimachus, with whom he fell in on the way.

== See also ==
- Second War of the Diadochi
