= 384 BC =

384 BC in various calendars
Gregorian calendar	384 BC; CCCLXXXIV BC
Ab urbe condita	370
Ancient Egypt era	XXIX dynasty, 15
Pharaoh	Hakor, 10
Ancient Greek Olympiad (summer)	99th Olympiad (victor)¹
Assyrian calendar	4367
Balinese saka calendar	N/A
Bengali calendar	−977 – −976
Berber calendar	567
Buddhist calendar	161
Burmese calendar	−1021
Byzantine calendar	5125–5126
Chinese calendar	丙申年 (Fire Monkey); 2314 or 2107 — to — 丁酉年 (Fire Rooster); 2315 or 2108
Coptic calendar	−667 – −666
Discordian calendar	783
Ethiopian calendar	−391 – −390
Hebrew calendar	3377–3378
- Hindu calendars
Vikram Samvat	−327 – −326
Shaka Samvat	N/A
Kali Yuga	2717–2718
Holocene calendar	9617
Iranian calendar	1005 BP – 1004 BP
Islamic calendar	1036 BH – 1035 BH
Javanese calendar	N/A
Julian calendar	N/A
Korean calendar	1950
Minguo calendar	2295 before ROC 民前2295年
Nanakshahi calendar	−1851
Thai solar calendar	159–160
Tibetan calendar	阳火猴年 (male Fire-Monkey) −257 or −638 or −1410 — to — 阴火鸡年 (female Fire-Rooster) −256 or −637 or −1409

Year 384 BC was a year of the pre-Julian Roman calendar. At the time, it was known as the Year of the Tribunate of Cornelius, Poplicola, Camillus, Rufus, Crassus and Capitolinus (or, less frequently, year 370 Ab urbe condita). The denomination 384 BC for this year has been used since the early medieval period, when the Anno Domini calendar era became the prevalent method in Europe for naming years.

== Events ==
=== By place ===
==== Greece ====
- Lysias, the Athenian orator, on the occasion of the Olympiad, rebukes the Greeks for allowing themselves to be dominated by the Syracusan tyrant Dionysius I and by the barbarian Persians.
- The Greeks found the colony of Pharos at the site of today’s Stari Grad on the island of Hvar, defeating Iadasinoi warriors brought in for its defense.

== Births ==
- Aristotle, Greek philosopher (d. 322 BC)
- Demosthenes, Greek statesman and orator (d. 322 BC)
