= Deinarchus of Corinth =

- Δείναρχος
- Died: 318 BC near Pharygae, Phocis, Central Greece
- Military career
- Allegiance: Corinth (under Timoleon); Antipater
- Service years: 343–318 BC
- Rank: Commander
- Conflicts: Storming of Syracuse; campaign against Carthage in Sicily
- Other work: Epimeletes of the Peloponnese (c. 322–318 BC)

Deinarchus of Corinth (also Deinarchos or Dinarchus; Ancient Greek: Δείναρχος; floruit 343–318 BC) was a Corinthian statesman and soldier of the late Classical and early Hellenistic period. With his associate Demaratus he became one of the two most influential pro-Macedonian Corinthians of his generation, and together they led the oligarchic faction that governed Corinth in cooperation with Philip II, Alexander III and the regent Antipater. After the Lamian War Antipater made him epimeletes ("overseer") of the Peloponnese. In or shortly before May 318 BC he was seized, tortured and executed on the orders of Polyperchon, Antipater's successor as regent, on suspicion of supporting Cassander.

He is not to be confused with his contemporary and fellow Corinthian Deinarchus son of Sostratus (c. 361/0 – after 292 BC), the Attic logographer and one of the Ten Attic Orators, with whom he was already confused in antiquity and is still sometimes confused in modern scholarship.

== Career ==
=== Service with Timoleon in Sicily ===
In 344 BC the Corinthians sent Timoleon to Sicily to help their colony Syracuse against the tyrant Dionysius II. After Timoleon's early successes, Corinth dispatched a further body of troops in spring 343, reported as 2,000 hoplites, 200 cavalry and ten ships. Among them were Deinarchus and Demaratus, who would become the two most influential pro-Macedonian Corinthians of the age. The pair had brought what Plutarch calls "the second reinforcement from Corinth", and they held joint commands in the fighting that followed. (Note: The "Deinarchus" named in Plutarch's Life of Timoleon is identified with the statesman by inference. Dixon treats the identification as secure and makes it central to his account of Deinarchus' career, whereas Heckel regards the Sicilian veteran as only "perhaps" identical with the later epimeletes.)

During the storming of Syracuse, then held by the rival general Hicetas, Timoleon divided his army into three; Deinarchus and Demaratus commanded the third division in the assault on Epipolae, the cliff above Syracuse, and the attack from three sides at once put Hicetas' men to flight and won the city. Timoleon then returned to Syracuse to organise its constitution, and sent the two Corinthians with a force of mercenaries into the Carthaginian-held west of the island. There they detached many cities from Carthage, kept their troops supplied from the country, and raised funds for the war from plunder.

=== Rise of the pro-Macedonian faction after Chaeronea ===
At the Battle of Chaeronea (2 August 338 BC), a Corinthian contingent fought without success alongside Athens and Thebes; after Philip's victory, Corinth briefly prepared to resist, then surrendered. The surrender transformed the city's politics. Those who had urged war on Philip lost their standing, and a new group of leaders, headed by Demaratus and Deinarchus, both veterans of Timoleon's expedition, negotiated the terms. The two went on to dominate the pro-Macedonian faction that controlled Corinth after Chaeronea. Philip cultivated them and gave them positions of power, and Alexander confirmed their standing; in return they kept Corinth, and its strategically vital citadel of Acrocorinth, loyal while Macedon prepared for the invasion of Asia. Demosthenes, in On the Crown (18.295), listed Deinarchus and Demaratus among the Greeks who had betrayed their fellow-citizens, alleging that they had reduced the Corinthians to near-slavery under Philip and that both were "bought men".

=== Under Alexander ===
When Alexander crossed into Asia, Demaratus went with him and rose among his hetairoi, while Deinarchus stayed in Corinth. His later prominence under Antipater suggests that during Alexander's long absence he held an important place in the pro-Macedonian oligarchy that governed the city, backed by the Macedonian garrison on Acrocorinth. By 324 BC, when Alexander sought divine honors from the Greek cities, Deinarchus was still the leading figure of that faction.

=== Epimeletes of the Peloponnese ===
After Antipater's victory in the Lamian War (323/2 BC), the regent appointed Deinarchus epimeletes of the Peloponnese. The office gave him authority over Corinthian and wider Peloponnesian affairs. Dixon compares it with the position later held by Demetrius of Phalerum, whom Antipater's son Cassander made epimeletes at Athens from 317 to 307, and infers that Deinarchus had a similar charge of government and internal administration across the Peloponnese. That Antipater gave the post to a Corinthian, rather than installing a tyrant as he did elsewhere in the region, suggests that Corinth kept a measure of internal autonomy and that Deinarchus had earned the regent's trust. It is possible that Philip or Alexander may have granted him a comparable position before this. A Macedonian officer presumably commanded the garrison on Acrocorinth during his tenure.

The Sixth Letter of the Demosthenic corpus mentions a letter that Antipater sent Deinarchus at Corinth, and dismisses him and others as the regent's "underlings" (τοῖς δ' ὑπηρετοῦσιν Ἀντιπάτρῳ). Dixon suggests the connection reached back to 331 BC, when Antipater saw Corinth's strategic importance during the war of Agis III. In the summer of 319, shortly before Antipater's death, Deinarchus was the chief accuser of Demades at the Macedonian court; Arrian names him "Deinarchus the Corinthian, the accuser" (Δείναρχος δὲ ὁ Κορίνθιος ὁ κατήγορος ἦν), and the same role is recorded by Plutarch and in a fragment attributed to Demades.

== Execution ==
Antipater died in late summer 319 BC. He had named Polyperchon, rather than his own son Cassander, to succeed him as regent and guardian of the kings Philip III Arrhidaeus and Alexander IV, so Corinth passed into Polyperchon's nominal control. In autumn 319 Polyperchon issued an edict in the name of Philip III, restoring exiles and reinstating the constitutions of Philip's and Alexander's day, measures aimed at undermining Cassander in southern Greece.

In spring 318, Deinarchus joined Phocion on the Athenian statesman's last embassy to Polyperchon. According to Plutarch, when Phocion and his remaining friends set out, Solon of Plataea and Deinarchus of Corinth went with them out of regard for Phocion, both being reputed close friends of Polyperchon. Deinarchus fell ill on the way, and the party waited many days at Elateia before meeting Polyperchon as he marched with the king near Pharygae, a village of Phocis below Mount Acrurium. Deinarchus had known Polyperchon when the latter served as a lieutenant of Antipater. When the delegation arrived, Polyperchon seated the king and his companions beneath a golden canopy; as soon as Deinarchus came forward he had him seized, tortured and put to death on suspicion of supporting Cassander, and only then gave audience to the Athenians. Plutarch, the only source for the execution, also dates it: Phocion was put to death at Athens on 19 Munychion (early May) 318, and Deinarchus died shortly before.

Deinarchus was treated differently from the other envoys. Phocion, the Athenian Hegemon, and the metic Solon of Plataea were sent back to Athens for trial and execution, whereas Deinarchus alone was killed on the spot, presumably because he was neither an Athenian citizen nor a metic. (Note: The observation is Paschidis', who cautions that the whole procedure was too irregular for the point to be pressed as evidence of Deinarchus' origin.) Dixon similarly treats Deinarchus' ties to Antipater, and perhaps to Cassander, as reason enough for Polyperchon to act, and suggests that the regent may also have seen the epimeletes as a tyrant imposed by Antipater whose removal would lend force to his edict.
