= Battle of Melitaea =

Battle of the Lamian War, 322 BC

Battle of Melitea
- Part of Lamian War
Date	322 BC
Location	Unknown location in Thessaly
Result	Greek coalition victory

Belligerents
Athens; Aetolian League; Thessalian League	Macedonian empire

Commanders and leaders
Antiphilos; Menon	Antipatros; Leonnatos †

Strength
22,000 infantry 3,500 cavalry	20,000 infantry 1,500 cavalry

The Battle of Melitaea took place in 322 BC during the Lamian War (323–322 BC). The Greek allies led by Antiphilus and Menon of Pharsalus won a victory against the Macedonian army commanded by Leonnatus, who died during the battle.

== Battle ==
The battle was fought between the Greek allies who had rebelled against the Macedonian Empire, and Leonnatus, the Macedonian satrap of Phrygia. Leonnatus had arrived to aid the regent Antipater, who was under siege by the Greeks in Lamia. Ultimately, the Greeks emerged victorious, defeating the Macedonians.

The Greeks, hearing news of Leonnatus's advance, lifted the siege of Lamia and detached their baggage train and camp followers to Melitea and advanced with their army hurried to defeat Leonnatus before Antipater's forces could join him. The Greeks and Macedonian armies were equal in number but the Greeks' 3,500 horsemen, including an elite 2,000 Thessalians commanded by Menon, against the Macedonians' 1,500 horse gave the advantage of mobility to the Greeks.

When the battle began, although the Macedonian phalanx gained the advantage everywhere, the Thessalians drove off the Macedonian cavalry and Leonnatus was carried from the battlefield already mortally wounded. After their cavalry was driven back the unsupported Macedonian Phalanx retreated from the plain to difficult terrain where the enemy cavalry couldn't pursue them.

The next day, Antipater arrived at the field and joined with the defeated army. He decided not to fight the Greeks yet, in view of their superior cavalry, and instead retreated through the rough terrain.

The location of the battle is not known. J. C. Yardley places it near the city of Melitea, in the north of Lamia.

== Bibliography ==
- J. C. Yardley, Pat Wheatley, Waldemar Heckel, Justin: Epitome of the Philippic History of Pompeius Trogus, Volume II, books 13-15: the Successors to Alexander the Great, Oxford University Press, 2011. ISBN 978-0-19-927759-9
