= Philotas (Antigonid general) =

Philotas (Greek: Φιλώτας) was a Macedonian general in the service of Antigonus I Monophthalmus, who was employed by him in 319 BC, to endeavour by bribes and promises to corrupt the Argyraspides in the service of Eumenes, and especially their leaders Antigenes and Teutamus. But his efforts were unavailing: Teutamus was tempted for a moment, but was recalled to the path of duty by his firmer-minded colleague, and the Argyraspids continued faithful (Diodorus, XVIII. 62-63).
