= Siege of Lamia =

Siege of Lamia between the Macedonians and central Greece

- Part of Lamian War
Date	323–322 BC
Location	Lamia
Result	Macedonian victory

Belligerents
Athens; Aetolian League; Thessalian League	Macedonia

Commanders and leaders
Leosthenes †	Antipatros

Strength
Unknown	Unknown

The siege of Lamia occurred from 323 to 322 BC between the Macedonians led by Antipater and a coalition of armies mostly from central Greece led by Leosthenes. The siege gave its name to the Lamian War.

After Antipater was defeated at the Second Battle of Thermopylae, he shut himself in the city of Lamia. Leosthenes approached the city and with his army fortified a camp, dug up a deep ditch and constructed a palisade. Initially, Leosthenes would draw up his forces, and approach the city and directly challenge the Macedonians to battle. The Macedonians denied this challenge, prompting Leosthenes to launch daily attacks on the walls with his soldiers.

The Macedonians defended themselves from the daily attacks and were able to halt the Greeks' attacks, because of the abundance of missiles and protection from the walls. Since Leosthenes was unable to storm the city, he shut off all supplies entering the city, believing this would reduce the army because of hunger. He also built a wall and dug a deep, wide ditch, cutting off all escape routes for the Macedonians.

The Aetolians all returned to Aetolia, due to national business Leosthenes agreed, Antipater and his men exhausted due to the anticipation of famine. Antipater initiated an attack on the men digging the moat and a struggle occurred. Leosthenes in an attempt to aid his men, was struck in the head by a stone from a sling shot and so he fainted and was dragged to camp. He died three days later.
