= Munichia =

Ancient Greek name for a hill in Piraeus, Greece

Coordinates: 37.9406°N 23.6559°E

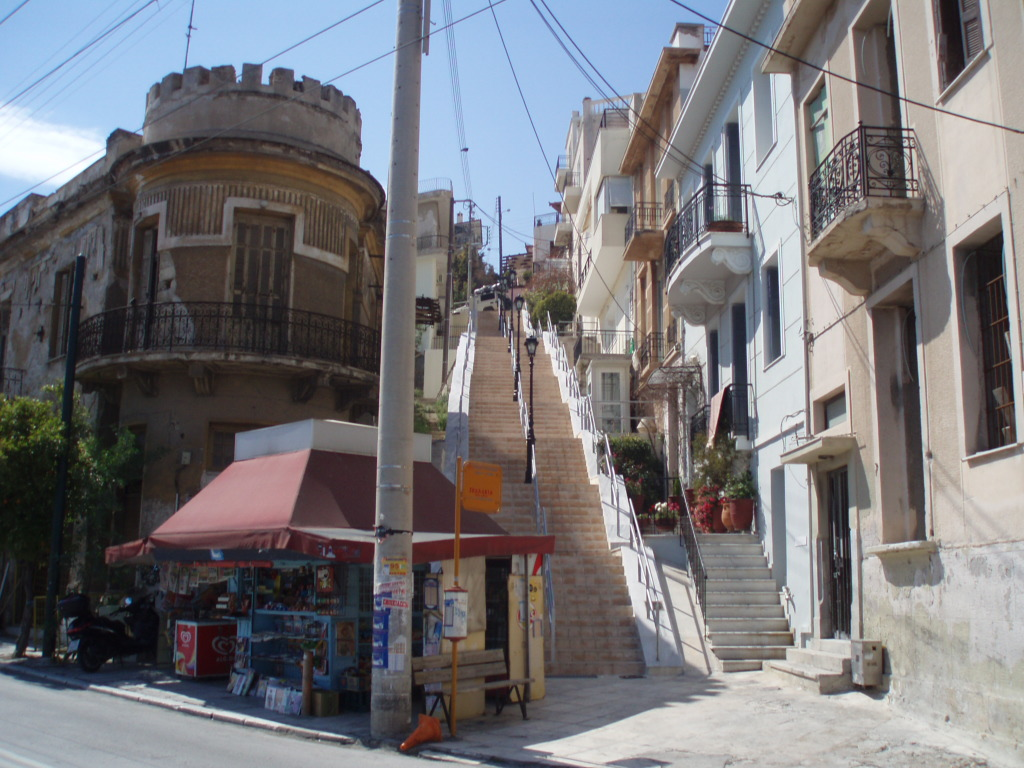
View of Kastella.

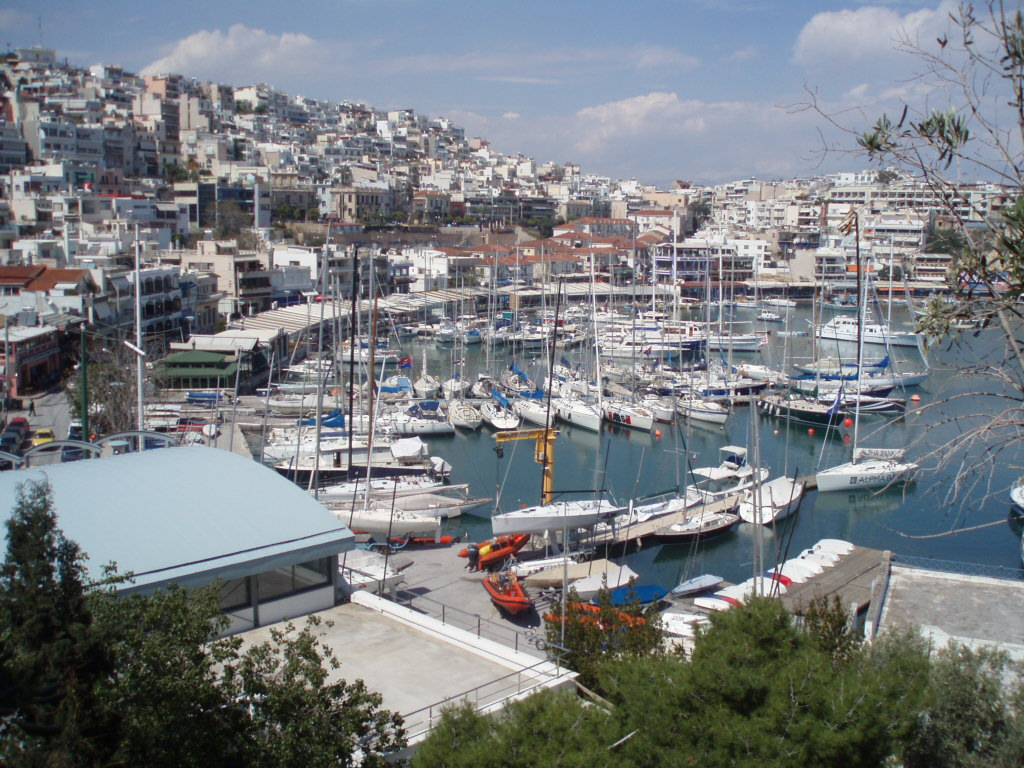
Mikrolimano

Munichia or Munychia (/mjuːˈnɪkiə/; Greek: Μουνιχία or Μουνυχία) is the ancient Greek name for a steep hill (86 metres (282 ft) high) in Piraeus, Greece, known today as Kastella (Καστέλλα).

This is a fashionable neighborhood in Piraeus. On top of the hill is a Greek Orthodox church named after the Prophet Elijah. The narrow streets surrounding the church are lined with picturesque houses. The Veakeio Theater, known for its summer performances, is located here.

In 404 BCE, Athenian democrats defeated forces of the Thirty Tyrants at the Battle of Munychia. After Athens was defeated in the Lamian war (323–322 BC), a Macedonian garrison was installed at Munichia. In antiquity, there was also a local festival to Artemis.
