= Leosthenes =

Athenian commander

Leosthenes (Ancient Greek: Λεωσθένης Λεωσθένους Κεφαλῆθεν, romanized: Leōsthenēs Leōsthenous Kephalēthen; died 323 BC) was an Athenian who was commander of the combined Greek army in the Lamian War. Leosthenes was the son of his namesake father Leosthenes who had suffered exile in 362/1 BC and who had fled to the court of Philip II. It is unknown by what means he had obtained the high reputation he had when he first makes his appearance in history. It has been inferred from a passage in Strabo, that he had first served under Alexander the Great in Asia; but it now seems certain that this is a mistake, and rather the reference should have been to Leonnatus.

== Military activities ==
It is certain that when Leosthenes is first the subject of distinct mention, he was an officer of acknowledged ability and established reputation in war, but a proponent of Greek freedom and vehement opponent of Macedonian rule. Inscriptions show that in 329/8 BC, he served as General of the Countryside, responsible for the garrisons and border patrols of Attica. In 324/3 and 323/2 BC he was involved in the maintenance of the Athenian navy. Shortly before the death of Alexander, Leosthenes collected and brought over to Cape Taenarum a large body of the Greek mercenaries that had been disbanded by the different satraps in Asia, following Alexander's orders.

As soon as the news of Alexander's death reached Athens, Leosthenes was despatched to Taenarus to engage the services of these 8,000 troops. Along with Athenian envoys who addressed the assemblies of many city-states, Leosthenes was instrumental in recruiting many Greek cities to the cause of Greek liberation. He first hastened to Aetolia, and persuaded the people of that region to join in the Greek war of liberation against Macedonia. Under the influence of such brilliant orators as Demosthenes, their example was followed by the Locrians, Phocians, Dorians, and many of the Thessalians, as well as by several of the states of the Peloponnese. Leosthenes, who was by common consent appointed commander-in-chief, assembled these combined forces in the neighbourhood of Thermopylae. The Boeotians, who, through fear of the restoration of Thebes and loss of their newly-acquired land, remained allied to the Macedonians, collected a force to prevent the Athenian contingent from joining the allied army. However, Leosthenes hastened with a part of his forces to assist the Athenians and totally defeated the Boeotian army.

The Macedonian general, Antipater, now advanced from the north with a force very inferior to that of the confederates. He was defeated in the first action near Thermopylae and compelled to retreat into the small town of Lamia. Leosthenes, keen to finish the war with one blow, prosecuted the siege with the utmost vigour. However, lacking battering machines or engineers, his assaults were repulsed and he was compelled to resort to the slower method of a blockade. While he was engaged in forming the lines of circumvallation, the besieged made a vigorous sally, during which Leosthenes received a blow on the head from a stone and died three days later. His death greatly discouraged the allied Greek cause and Pausanias is probably right in regarding it as the main cause of their ultimate failure. Phocion's remark, on the other hand, is well known, that Leosthenes "was very well fitted for a short course, but not equal to a long one."

It is considered that Leosthenes did demonstrate that he had great energy and ability during the short period of his command and his loss was mourned by the Athenians as a public calamity. He was honoured with a public burial in the Ceramicus and his funeral oration was pronounced by Hyperides. His death took place before the close of the year 323 BC. While he was still quite a young man, it appears that he left children, whose statues were set up by the side of his own in the Piraeus.
