= Lamian War =

War fought in Greece in 323–322 BCE

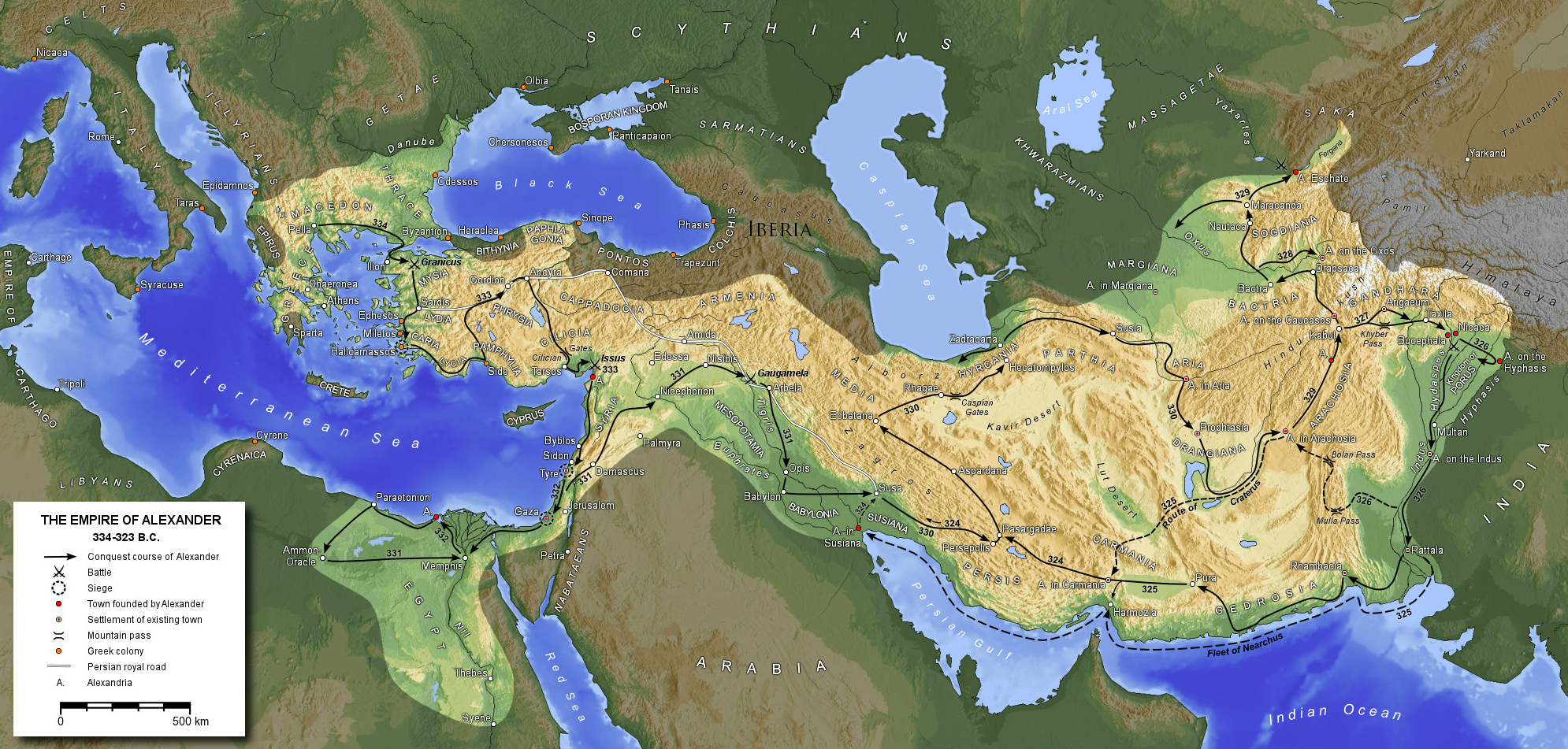
- Extent of the empire of Alexander the Great
Date	323–322 BC
Location	Greece
Result	Macedonian victory

Belligerents
Athens; Aetolian League; Thessalian League; Phocis	Macedonian Empire; Boeotian League; Euboea; Acarnanian League

Commanders and leaders
Leosthenes †; Antiphilos; Menon; Euetion; Phocion	Antipater; Leonnatus †; Craterus; Cleitus; Polyperchon

The Lamian War or the Hellenic War (323–322 BC), was an unsuccessful attempt by Athens and a large coalition of Greek states to end the hegemony of Macedonia over Greece just after the death of Alexander the Great. It was the last time Athens played a significant role as an independent power.

War was simmering in Greece after Alexander the Great issued the Exiles' Decree (in 324 BC), which ordered the Greek states to return all the people they had forced into exile. This decree meant that Athens had to surrender the island of Samos, colonised by Athenian clerurchs since 365 BC, while the Aetolian League had to leave Oiniadai, taken c.330 BC. Once the death of Alexander became known in June 323 BC, most city-states in mainland Greece revolted and founded the Hellenic League, recalling the alliance forged during the Persian Wars, this time with Macedonia in the role of the foreign invader. The Greeks were initially successful under their Athenian commander-in-chief Leosthenes, who managed to besiege Antipater, the Macedonian general in Europe, in the city of Lamia, which gave its name to the war. However, the arrival of a large Macedonian fleet commanded by Cleitus the White from the Levant turned the tide in favour of Macedonia. Even though Athens had more ships than Macedonia, it did not have enough crews to man them all and its overextended navy was defeated off the Echinades islands and Amorgos.

On land, the Greeks lifted the siege of Lamia with the arrival of Macedonian reinforcements from Asia. At the head of a large merged army, Antipater defeated the Greeks in Thessaly at the Battle of Krannon, after which he received the surrender of every city-state in central Greece. Faced with the prospect of a naval blockade and a land invasion, Athens capitulated. It had to give up its navy, host a Macedonian garrison on its soil, lose its possessions outside Attica, and even trade its democracy for an oligarchic regime. Symbolic of this event's significance, the famous orator Demosthenes committed suicide to avoid his capture by the Macedonians. Athens never again played a leading role in Greek geopolitics after the Lamian War.

While Antipater was turning his forces west to deal with the Aetolian League, the last member of the Greek alliance still fighting, he was called back to Asia by the beginning of the Wars of the Diadochi between Alexander's generals. The Aetolian League therefore escaped unscathed and appear to be the real winner of the war, because Athens bore most of the fight, and the league remained mostly in place. The Aetolian League then became one of the most important states in Greece during the Hellenistic era.

== Sources and name of the war ==
=== Sources ===
The main ancient source on the Lamian War is the Greek historian Diodorus of Sicily, who composed a very large work, the Bibliotheca historica, at the very end of the Roman Republic. The events of the war are detailed in books 17–18. Modern historians have been very critical of Diodorus, for his careless treatment of chronology, inability to deal with conflicting sources, insertions of his own opinions as facts, omission of entire years of events, etc. Diodorus is nevertheless useful because his work preserves fragments of lost historians. His books dealing with the Lamian War drew extensively on Hieronymus of Cardia, the main historian of the beginning of the Hellenistic era, who also played a historical role and met many of the generals of Alexander the Great.

Plutarch, a Greek moralist who lived at the time of the Flavian emperors and Trajan, is also a good source thanks to his biographies of Demosthenes and Phocion, two leading politicians in Athens at the time.

=== Name ===
The initial name of the war was the Hellenic War, mostly labelled as such in epigraphic material of the end of the 4th century and beginning of the 3rd century. It was chosen by the Greeks in order to recall their victorious war against the Persian Empire in the first half of the 5th century, thus placing Macedonia in the role of Persia. The name of their coalition, the Hellenic League, was chosen for the same reason. In his biography of Phocion, Plutarch writes "Hellenic War", because his source was Duris of Samos, who wrote a history book of the period in the 270s, at a time when it was still the common name. The name shift to "Lamian War" happened with Hieronymus of Cardia, who wrote an influential book just a decade after Duris. He was a pro-Macedonian writer who wanted to avoid using the name "Hellenic War" that was too much directed against Macedonia. Hieronymus' Macedonian bias can be retrieved from Diodorus' writings, as he mostly based his account from Hieronymus, and as a result has a negative tone towards the Greeks and their attempt to recover their freedom. Moreover, Hieronymus wrote his book after the Chremonidean War (267–261), another unsuccessful revolt of the Greeks against Macedonia, and likewise wished to avoid any reminder of the Persian Wars.

This theory was first made by N. G. Ashton in 1984 and has found general acceptance since. However, in 2011, John Walsh has suggested that the name Lamian War was first coined by the poet Choerilus of Iasus, who composed an epic named Lamiaka about the war soon after the events. It means that Choerilus had identified the siege of Lamia as the turning point of the war. Walsh notes that such epics became fashionable during the Hellenistic era and that Choerilus might have been a member of the court of Antipater, the Macedonian regent in Europe, also a man of letters. Therefore, Hieronumus would have only popularised a term that already existed.

== Background ==
In 338 BC, the Macedonian king Philip II defeated a coalition of Greek states led by Thebes and Athens at the battle of Chaeronea. He then forced the Greeks into an hegemonic alliance called the League of Corinth in order to secure his back while he started a war of conquest against the Persian empire, but resentment remained high among the Greeks. In 335 Thebes revolted upon hearing false news that the new Macedonian king Alexander III had died, but he acted quickly and razed Thebes to the ground. Four years later, the Spartan king Agis III led another war of liberation against Macedonia, which was defeated by Antipater at the battle of Megalopolis. At the same time, a new federal state in central Greece called the Aetolian League took advantage of Agis' revolt to capture the city of Oiniadai, which was repopulated with Aetolians. In 324, Alexander completed his conquests in Asia and moved to Mesopotamia, where he proclaimed the Exiles' Decree, which demanded that citizens forced into exile in any Greek city had to be allowed to return to their home. Read at the Olympic Games on 4 August 324 BC before a crowd of 20,000 exiles, the Exiles' Decree caused a lot of tension in Greece, especially in Athens, which had colonised the island of Samos for several decades and did not want to abandon this valuable possession. The Aetolian League was also ordered to withdraw from Oiniadai; Alexander threatened to come in person to punish the Aetolians.

== Course of the war ==
=== Declaration of war ===
Athens was already preparing for war when the news of Alexander's death in June 323 BC became known; war started shortly after, probably in the beginning of September. Two Athenian politicians are known to have advised against the war: Phocion and Demades, who represented the interests of the landed aristocracy. The latter lost his political rights because of his support of Macedonia, and especially for having sponsored the bill that gave Alexander the Great the status of a god. A friend of Antipater, Aristotle was also condemned on a spurious charge of impiety, and left Athens for Chalcis in Euboea.

Before his death, Alexander had wanted to settle his Greek mercenaries in Persis, but many of them (in the tens of thousands) returned to Greece before that could happen. They escaped through a fleet raised by an Athenian mercenary named Leosthenes, who brought them to the Greek mainland. Secretly in touch with his native city, Leosthenes kept about 8,000 of these mercenaries with him in Cape Taenarum (a mercenary market on Spartan territory) and carved an alliance with the Aetolians, waiting for the right moment to go to war against Macedonia. The life of Leosthenes before the Lamian War has long been debated by scholars, who describe him as having served either Alexander or Darius, then acting as either a private mercenary leader or a strategos (an elected magistrate at Athens). John Walsh also suggests that Leosthenes' achievements were exaggerated by the ancient historian Diodorus of Sicily.

=== Belligerents ===
Athens was able to receive the support of many Greek states, principally in northern and central Greece. These states had likely been approached during the Nemean Games that took place in summer 323, where representatives of most city-states gathered. The Aetolian League was the most natural ally, as its members were equally concerned by the Exiles' Decree. The alliance was possibly concluded in mid-September 323 BC. Other allies from the area joined successively in this chronological order: Thessaly except Pelinna, Oetaea except Heraklea, Achaea Phthiotis except Phthiotic Thebes, Malis except Lamia, Doris, Locris, Phokis, Ainis, Alyzeia, Dolopia, Athamania, the island of Leukas in the Ionian Sea, some of the Molossians in Epirus. Alliances were also concluded further north with some Illyrian and Thracian tribes. N. G. L. Hammond also mentions that the Odrysian king Seuthes III was at war with Macedonia at the same time, but does not connect this revolt to the Lamian War.

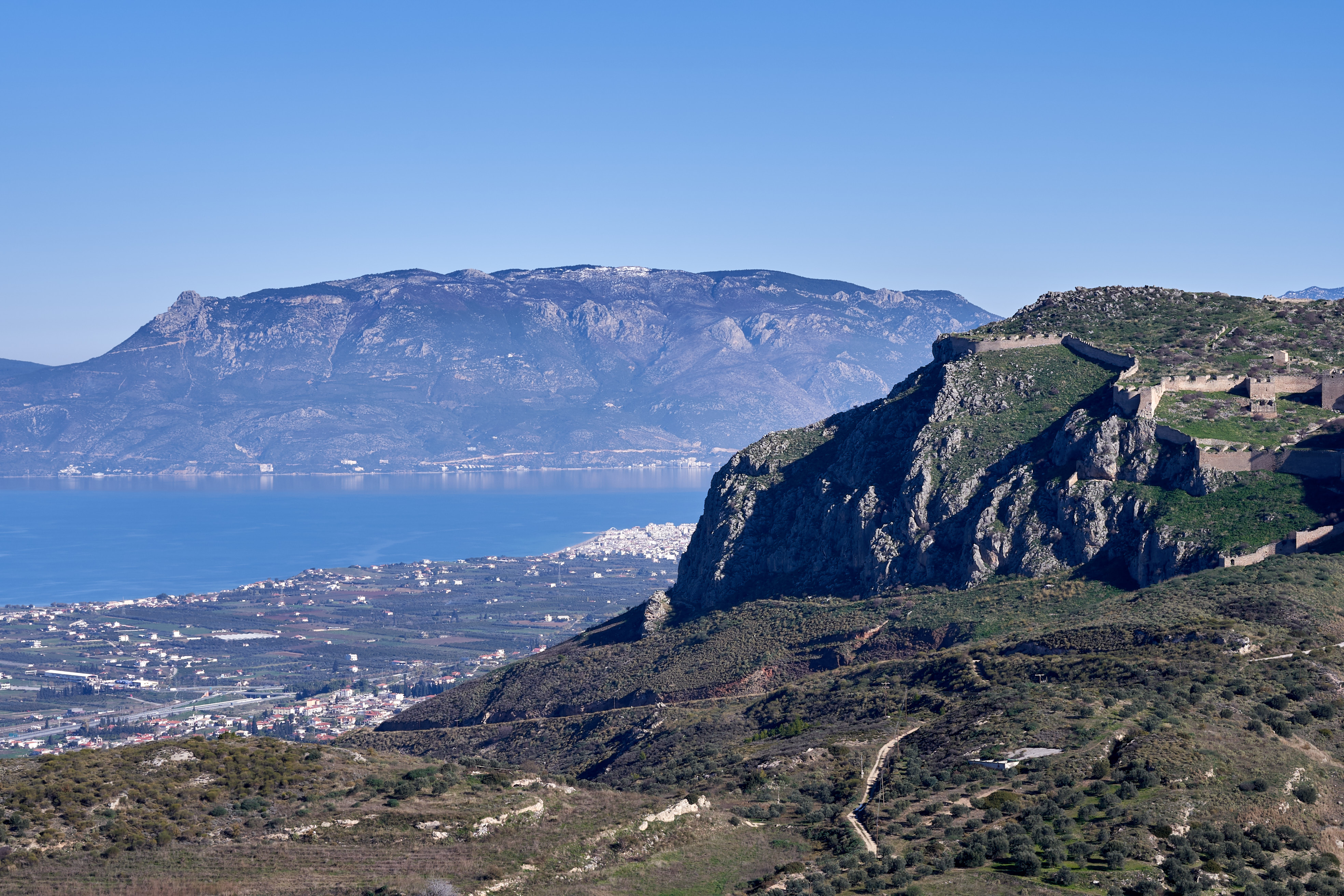
The Acrocorinth fortress, with Corinth and the Corinthian Gulf behind.

In the Peloponnese, Argos, Sicyon, the Acte peninsula including Epidaurus and Troezen, Phlius, Elis, and Messenia joined the Hellenic League. These cities followed Athens at a later date than the northern cities, as the treaty between Athens and Phokis is dated from 27 October, while that with Sicyon is from 23 December. It showed that Athens' diplomatic effort continued over several months after the beginning of the war.

Sparta refused to join, mainly because of their losses during the War of Agis III, but also because the war was led by Athens, which had refused to support Agis. In addition, Sparta did not want to join an alliance that counted its traditional enemies Argos and Messenia. Several leading Spartans were also held hostages by Macedonia in Asia. Kleonai rejected the alliance with Athens, despite its earlier diplomatic overture during the Nemean Games nearby. Arcadian states remained neutral, likewise because of their losses during the War of Agis. Although the Arcadians were initially pro-Macedonian, it is possible that Demosthenes convinced them to withdraw from their alliance with Macedonia while he was in exile in Troezen. Rewarded for his diplomatic help in the Peloponnese, Demosthenes was recalled to Athens during the winter of 323–322 BC.

The Hellenic League had much less success in the Aegean Sea, as only Rhodes and Carystus (on the southern tip of Euboea) answered favourably. The other islanders probably felt more threatened by the imperialism of Athens than that of Macedonia, and were more sympathetic to the cause of Samos, still occupied by Athens. Although Rhodes expelled its Macedonian garrison at the same time as the war, it might not have joined the Hellenic League.

Nevertheless, very few states in Greece remained loyal to Macedonia, apart from the Euboean League, still resentful at Athens for its recent interventions in the island, and Boeotia. After the destruction of Thebes in 335 BC, its territory was shared between the other Boeotian cities, which now feared that Athens would restore it. Acarnania still supported Macedonia, because of Oiniadai, which had been taken by the Aetolian League. For an unknown reason, the Acarnanian city of Alyzeia sided alone with the Hellenic League.

Macedonia also had garrisons in the acropoleis of Thebes (Cadmea) and Corinth (Acrocorinth). The occupation of Acrocorinth ensured Corinth's neutrality and also prevented the Peloponnesian states from joining their armies with those of northern states, as it blocked the Isthmus. The pro-Macedonian faction in Corinth was led by Deinarchus, whom Antipater would appoint epimeletes (overseer) of the Peloponnese after the war. Ioanna Kralli notes that apart from Sicyon, "the Peloponnesian participants demonstrated lack of commitment" during the war as a result.

=== Early Athenian successes (autumn 323 BC) ===
Once the war became official, Athens sent 50 talents to Leosthenes to pay his mercenaries and the allied Greeks made him "General of the Greeks". From Taenarum, he moved to Aetolia, where he received the command of 7,000 Aetolians, then to Boeotia in order to join his troops with that of Athens, which had sent 5,000 hoplites, 2,000 mercenaries, and 500 cavalry. Leosthenes defeated an army of Boeotians, Euboeans, and Macedonians (the garrison from the Cadmea), near Plataea. This early success won the adhesion of most other states of central Greece. With an army of about 30,000 men, Leosthenes moved to the north and defended the Thermopylae pass, while waiting for the Macedonian response.

In order to prevent the revolt from spreading to Thessaly, Antipater moved south with the Macedonian army of 13,000 phalangites and 600 cavalry, while his navy of 110 triremes followed him with supplies along the coast. In Thessaly, he recruited about 2,000 cavalry, then advanced towards the Greek army at the Thermopylae. However, the Thessalian cavalry betrayed Antipater and destroyed his Macedonian cavalry in the process. Antipater managed to turn back with his phalanx still intact and entered in Lamia (15km north of the Thermopylae), the only city of the area that had remained faithful to Macedonia. He barricaded there and waited for the reinforcements to come from Asia. N. G. L. Hammond called Antipater's decision "brilliant": it forced the Greeks to lay a difficult siege on Lamia as they could not invade Macedonia while letting such a large Macedonian force in their back. Antipater nonetheless suffered the first Macedonian defeat on Greek soil in 30 years, ever since the Third Sacred War.

At the same time, the Athenian strategos Phaidros led an expedition that destroyed the Euboean city of Styra, which belonged to Eretria. Euboean cities were on the Macedonian side, except Karystos, which northern border was near Styra, and was likely helped by Athens against its neighbour. The goal of the expedition was perhaps to intimidate the Euboean cities, or the price demanded by Karystos for its alliance with Athens.

=== The war at sea ===
At the start of the war, Athens had a massive navy of more than 410 warships: 360 triremes, 50 quadriremes, and 7 quinqueremes. It could nevertheless only man about 200 ships; a number that still outnumbered the available Macedonian fleet in the Aegean Sea. Initially, Antipater could only rely on the 110 ships that had escorted the treasure Alexander sent with Harpalus. However, in 322 BC, the situation was reversed with the decisive arrival of the Macedonian admiral Cleitus the White, at the head of a large navy of 240 ships. These ships came from a navy of 1,000 vessels commissioned by Alexander before he died. Although Alexander's grandiose plans were abandoned after his death, some of the ships had already been built in the Levant.

In a short passage, Diodorus Siculus, the main source of the Lamian War, tells that Cleitus the White defeated the Athenian admiral Euetion in two battles off some islands called the Echinades. This passage has been widely discussed among modern scholars. In 1924, T. Walek set the standard view for the rest of the 20th century, that the Echinades islands cannot be those located off Acarnania in the Ionian Sea, but some islands in the Malian Gulf off the city of Echinus, not far from Lamia where Antipater was still besieged. In 2001, Brian Bosworth rejected Walek's view, and instead considered that Diodorus must be correct, as the Echinades islands are just off the city of Oiniadai, which was the city captured by the Aetolian League c.330 BC and one of the main causes of the war. Bosworth's theory has since shifted the majority view towards his explanation of the events.

The Macedonian fleet commanded by Cleitus must have passed through the Diolkos to sail that fast to Acarnania. Corinth and the Diolkos had remained firmly under Macedonian control thanks to the very strong fortress of the Acrocorinth nearby. The Macedonian navy was likely supporting a land offensive of the Acarnanians towards Oiniadai in an operation to retake this city from the Aetolian League. It would explain why the Aetolians suddenly left the siege of Lamia to return home. Grainger supposes it was to hold their elections, but Bosworth suggests that the Aetolians had to defend their territory attacked by the Acarnanians in late 323 BC. The two victories of Cleitus against Euetion apparently resulted in the evacuation of Oiniadai by the Aetolians, because in the next mention in the sources, this city was in Acarnanian hands. This side of the conflict prevented the Aetolians from helping the other Greeks against Antipater, as they were missing from the remaining battles of the war.

The defeats off the Echinades island had not been decisive, and the Athenians still had several hundreds of ships. However, in the attempt to match the number of Macedonian ships, they overextended their limited amount of rowers, and their ships were undermanned. The Athenian war effort was still considerable as the sailors must been about 30,000, a number not seen since the invasion of Greece by Xerxes in 480. In the late summer 322 BC, the largest battle of the Lamian war took place off the island of Amorgos in the Cyclades, located not far from Samos, as Cleitus was by now challenging the Athenian hold of this island. Undermanned and outnumbered, the Athenian navy was soundly defeated.

Another Athenian defeat might have taken place near the Hellespont (now called the Dardanelles), as Athens had to bring corn supplies from the Black Sea through these narrow straights, which shores were controlled by Macedonia.

At an unknown date, an Athenian army commanded by Phocion repelled an amphibious Macedonian raid led by Mikion on the town of Rhamnous in Attica. This raid had possibly been launched from Chalcis while the Athenian navy was away.

=== Macedonian counter-offensive on land ===
Antipater remained besieged in Lamia for most of the winter 323–322 BC, but he did not stay inactive. The Macedonian army made sorties, during one of which Leosthenes was killed, perhaps by a slinger. Antipater waited for reinforcement from Lysimachus, the Macedonian commander in Thrace, but he was too facing a revolt from Seuthes, king of the Odrysians. He also requested help from Leonnatus, who was in Phrygia, and Craterus in Cilicia, whom Antipater also promised the hand of two of his available daughters; likely Eurydice for Leonnatus and Phila for Craterus. Leonnatus was the first to arrive; he could cross the Hellespont after the Athenian navy was defeated there. His help was not disinterested, as he intended to marry Cleopatra, the sister of Alexander, who had offered herself in marriage to him with the support of Alexander's mother, Olympias, who disliked Antipater. With such strong and symbolic supports, Leonnatus coveted the Macedonian throne.

Leonnatus had an army of 20,000 foot soldiers and 1,500 cavalry. He arrived in Thessaly in early Spring 322 BC, but did not coordinate with Antipater. The new commander of the Greeks Antiphilus lifted the siege of Lamia to fight Leonnatus. The following battle was only fought between the respective cavalries, of whom the very strong Thessalian cavalry commanded by Menon of Pharsalus (also appointed commander of the Greeks) had the upper hand and even killed Leonnatus, but the Macedonian infantry could retreat on higher grounds. The location of the battle is not known; Yardley places it was at Melitaea, in the north of Lamia, while Hammond just mentions "the open plain of Thessaly", and Westlake suggests it was "perhaps in the south of the Pelasgiotid plain".

This Greek victory nevertheless allowed Antipater to escape from Lamia while the Greek army had left to fight Leonnatus (whose death suited Antipater as he lost a dangerous rival). Antipater merged his army with that of Leonnatus and that of Craterus, who had just arrived from Cilicia with 10,000 hoplites (including 6,000 veterans), 1,500 cavalry, and 1,000 Persian archers and slingers. Antipater thus commanded a very large army of 40,000 soldiers, 3,000 archers and slingers, and 5,000 cavalry, which was much bigger than the 25,000 hoplites and 3,500 horses of Antiphilus. The final battle took place at Crannon on 6 August 322 BC. Although the Thessalian cavalry had the upper hand in the horse battle, the Greek infantry was pushed back and disengaged. Casualties were limited, with 500 dead for the Greeks (including 200 Athenians) and 130 for the Macedonians, but the outcome was decisive enough to compel the Athenians and their allies to sue for peace.

Brian Bosworth suggests that initially, the Macedonian armies commanded by Antipater and Leonnatus were mostly composed of Asian levies and mercenaries. It is only with the arrival of Craterus with his army only made of Macedonians soldiers that the Greeks lost their momentum on land.

The generals of the Greek Antiphilus and Menon first wished to negotiate for the entire alliance, but Antipater only wanted to deal with each city individually. He then conquered Thessalian cities one by one, which made all the Greek states apart from Athens and the Aetolians to surrender individually. Greek states thereafter competed with each other to have the best terms possible from Antipater.

== Aftermath ==
=== Athens' punishment ===
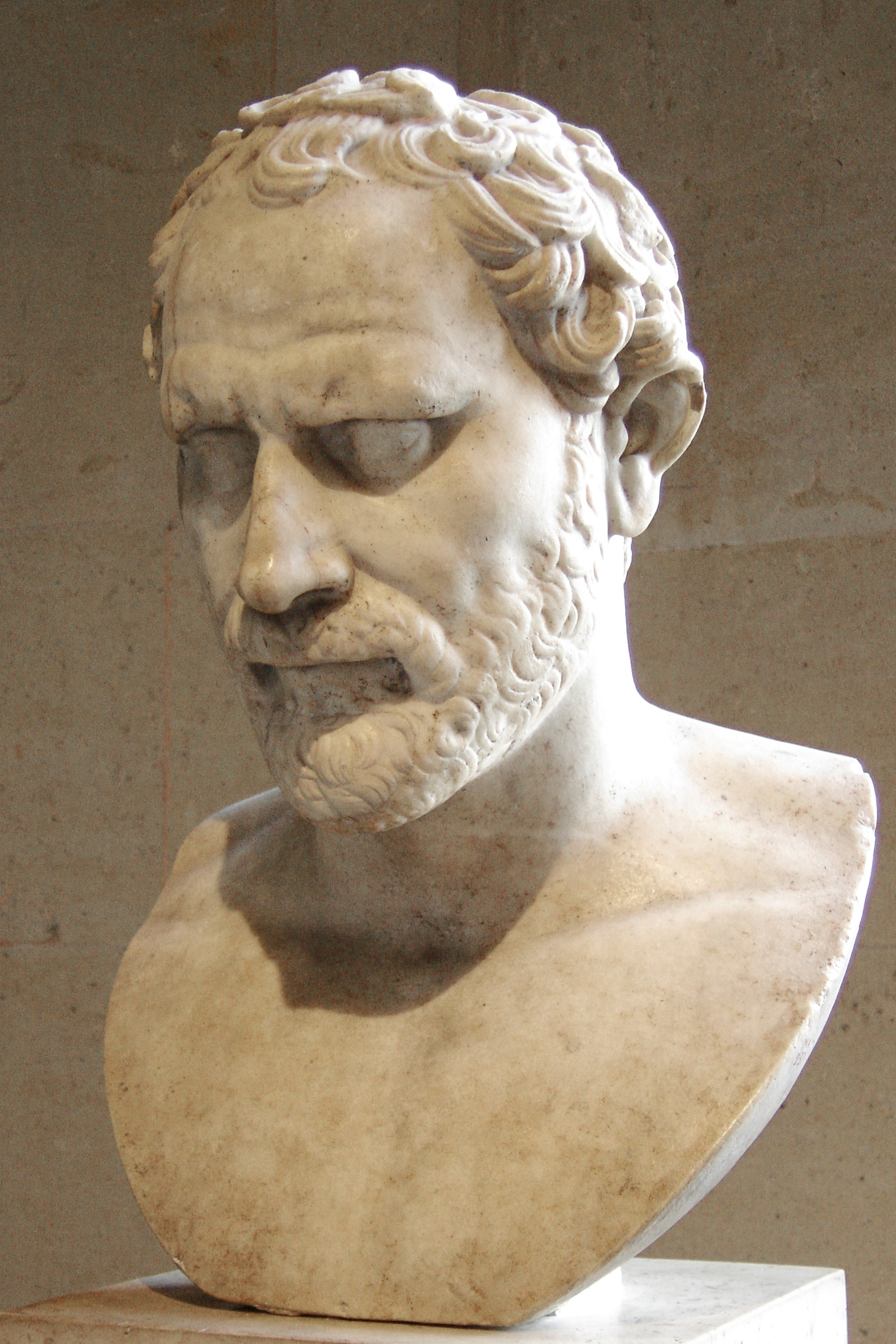
Bust of Demosthenes in the Louvre. Demosthenes committed suicide to avoid his capture by Macedonia.

Once Antipater reached Boeotia, Athens sought for peace. The Athenian delegation to Antipater was composed of Demades and Phocion, the two leading politician who had spoken against the war with Macedonia, as well as Xenocrates of Chalcedon, the head of Plato's Academy. Antipater demanded the installation of a Macedonian garrison in the fortress of Munychia in the harbour of Piraeus, which was thus taken on 18 September 322 BC.

Antipater also requested the extradition of the Athenian leaders who had pushed for the war against Macedonia. Demades carried the subsequent motion in the ecclesia sentencing to death these leaders, of whom the most prominent included Demosthenes, Hypereides, and Eucrates, who were hunted by Macedonian henchmen throughout Greece. Hypereides was murdered in Kleonai on 6 October 322 BC, while Demosthenes committed suicide one week later. Anti-Macedonian leaders suffered from the same fate in other Greek cities, such as Euphron of Sicyon.

The constitution of Athens was altered so that only citizens with properties worth more than 2,000 drachmas retained their political rights. The citizen body therefore decreased from 21,000 to 9,000. This amendment was likely suggested by Demades and Phocion themselves, but opposed by Xenocrates. Upon his return, the latter refused to be granted the Athenian citizenship as he did not want to become part of a regime he rejected.

Finally, Athens lost the city of Oropus and the sanctuary of the Amphiareion on its northern border, which had been given by Philip from Thebes in 338 BC after the battle of Chaeronea. Antipater carefully avoided dealing with Samos, and referred the matter to Perdiccas, who de facto controlled the empire after the death of Alexander. Perdiccas nevertheless upheld Alexander's will and demanded Athens to evacuate Samos. The cleruchs of Samos had to return to Athens, among whom was notably the young Epicurus.

The war was a catastrophe for the economy of Athens. Most building programs were stopped and the marble and metal industries died out in the city, which also suffered from famine at the beginning of the 3rd century.

=== Settlement in the Peloponnese ===
Antipater established or confirmed oligarchies in the Greek cities, and gave the supervision of the Peloponnese to Deinarchus, a leading figure of Corinth's pro-Macedonian oligarchy and a veteran of Timoleon's expedition to Sicily. That the post went to a Corinthian rather than a Macedonian, and that Corinth escaped the imposition of a tyrant, suggests the city kept a measure of internal autonomy as a reward for its loyalty during the war. Deinarchus held the office until 318, when Polyperchon, Antipater's successor, had him seized, tortured and executed.

== Historiography ==
Ancient authors often severely judged the Greeks for having started the Lamian War. Although born in Athens, the 3rd century AD historian Dexippus considered that it was irrational for Athens to attack the many times more powerful empire of Alexander. He also criticised the Athenians for their arrogance even after their defeat at Crannon.

The 19th-century radical politician and historian George Grote considered the outcome of the Lamian War a calamitous tragedy, marking the extinction of an "autonomous Hellenic world". On his account, it extinguished free speech in Greece and dispersed the Athenian Demos to distant lands. Nevertheless, the war, in spite of its disastrous result, was a "glorious effort for the recovery of Grecian liberty, undertaken under circumstances which promised a fair chance of success."

== Bibliography ==
=== Ancient sources ===
- Diodorus Siculus, Bibliotheke 17-18. Translation on Lacus Curtius
- Hypereides, Funeral Oration
- Plutarch, Lives, Phocion 23–29 and Demosthenes 27–30.

=== Modern sources ===
- N. G. Ashton, "The Lamian War. A false start?", Antichthon 17, 1983, pp. 47–63.
- ——, "The Lamian War-stat magni nominis umbra", The Journal of Hellenic Studies, Vol. 104, 1984, pp. 152–157.
- Albert Brian Bosworth, "Why did Athens lose the Lamian War?", in Olga Palagia & Stephen V. Tracy, The Macedonians in Athens, 322-229 B.C., Proceedings of an International Conference Held at the University of Athens, May 24-26, 2001, Oxbow Books, 2001. ISBN 1-84217-092-9
- ——, The Legacy of Alexander, Politics, Warfare, and Propaganda under the Successors, Oxford University Press, 2002. ISBN 978-0-19-815306-1
- J. K. Davies, Athenian Propertied Families 600-300 B.C., Oxford University Press, 1971.
- Michael D. Dixon, Late Classical and early Hellenistic Corinth: 338–196 B.C., Oxford, Routledge, 2014. ISBN 978-0-415-73551-3
- Errington, R. M. "Samos and the Lamian war." Chiron 5 (1975) 51-57.
- John D. Grainger, The League of the Aitolians, Leiden, Brill, 1999. ISBN 9004109110
- Christian Habicht, Athens from Alexander to Antony, Harvard University Press, 1997 (originally published in German in 1995). ISBN 9780674051119
- N. G. L. Hammond, F. W. Walbank, A History of Macedonia, volume III, 336-167 B. C., Oxford, Clarendon Press, 1988. ISBN 0198148151
- Waldemar Heckel, The marshals of Alexander’s empire, London, Routledge, 1992. ISBN 0-203-97389-5
- Ioanna Kralli, The Hellenistic Peloponnese: Interstate Relations, A Narrative and Analytic History, from the Fourth Century to 146 BC, Swansea, The Classical Press of Wales, 2017. ISBN 978-1-910589-60-1
- Denis Knoepfler, "La date de l'annexion de Styra par Érétrie", Bulletin de Correspondance Hellénique, 1971, 95-1, pp. 223–244.
- Gunther Martin, "Antipater after the Lamian War: New Readings in Vat. Gr. 73 (Dexippus fr. 33)", The Classical Quarterly, Vol. 55, No. 1 (May, 2005), pp. 301–305.
- Stella G. Miller, "Menon's Cistern", Hesperia: The Journal of the American School of Classical Studies at Athens, Vol. 43, No. 2 (Apr. - Jun., 1974), pp. 194–245.
- Stephen G. Miller, "Kleonai, the Nemean Games, and the Lamian War", Hesperia Supplements, Vol. 20, Studies in Athenian Architecture, Sculpture and Topography. Presented to Homer A. Thompson (1982), pp. 100–108.
- Oikonomides, A. N. "Athens and the Phokians at the outbreak of the Lamian War (= IG II 367)." The Ancient World 5 (1982) pp. 123–127.
- Schmitt, O., Der Lamische Krieg (1992)
- N. V. Sekunda, "Athenian Demography and Military Strength 338-322 BC", The Annual of the British School at Athens, 1992, Vol. 87 (1992), pp. 311–355.
- Th. Walek, "Les opérations navales pendant la Guerre Lamiaque", Revue de Philologie, n°48, 1924, pp. 23–30.
- John Walsh, "Historical Method and a Chronological Problem in Diodorus, Book 18" In P. Wheatley and R. Hannah (eds), Alexander and His Successors: Essays from the Antipodes (Claremont: 2009) 72-88.
- ——, "The Lamiaka of Choerilus and the Genesis of the term 'Lamian War'", Classical Quarterly (2011) 61.2, pp. 538–544.
- ——, "Leosthenes and the transportation of Greek mercenaries from Asia Minor", Studia Humaniora Tartuensia, Vol. 13 (2012), pp. 1–11.
- Westlake, H. D. "The Aftermath of the Lamian War." Classical Review 63 (1949) 87-90
- J. C. Yardley, Pat Wheatley, Waldemar Heckel, Justin: Epitome of the Philippic History of Pompeius Trogus, Volume II, books 13-15: the Successors to Alexander the Great, Oxford University Press, 2011. ISBN 978-0-19-927759-9
