= Battle of Crannon =

Battle of the Lamian War

- Part of the Lamian War
Date	August 322 BC
Location	Thessaly
Result	Macedonian victory

Belligerents
Macedonian Empire	Athens; Thessalian League; Aetolian League

Commanders and leaders
Antipatros; Krateros	Antiphilos; Menon

The Battle of Crannon (322 BC), fought between the Macedonian forces of Antipater and Craterus and the forces of a coalition of cities including Athens and the Aetolian League, was the decisive battle of the Lamian War. The Macedonian victory, though militarily unspectacular, convinced the other Greeks to sue for peace.

== Prelude ==
The Athenians, upon learning of the death of Alexander the Great in June 323 BC, decided to turn against Macedonian hegemony in the rest of Greece. Recruiting a force of mercenaries and joined by many other city-states, the Athenians were at first able to bring superior numbers against the enemy as Antipater, the Macedonian viceroy in Europe, was lacking sufficient troops due to the Macedonian campaigns in the east. Forced to take refuge in Lamia, Antipater called for reinforcements from Asia. The first to respond, Leonnatus, led his forces against the Athenian cavalry but was killed in the subsequent battle. Though the Athenians defeated Leonnatus and his reinforcements at Rhamnus, Antipater was able to leave from Lamia with his and Leonnatus' remaining forces. The arrival of a third Macedonian force under the leadership of Craterus decidedly shifted the numerical superiority to the Macedonian side.

== Battle ==
Antipater and Craterus now marched their combined army south to force the Athenians and their allies into battle. The Athenians, after calling together their dispersed forces, met the Macedonians near Crannon in Thessaly.

Relying on the high reputation of the Thessalian horse, the Athenian general Antiphilus decided to try to win the battle using cavalry, as in the prior battle with Leonnatus. The battle therefore opened with the clash between the Athenian-led and Macedonian cavalry. With the cavalry of both sides occupied, Antipater ordered his infantry to charge the enemy line. The Athenian infantry was driven back by the more numerous Macedonians and withdrew to the high ground from where they could easily repulse any Macedonian assault. Seeing their infantry in retreat, the Athenian cavalry disengaged from the battle, leaving the field and handing victory to the Macedonians.

== Aftermath ==
While the Athenian led army was still intact, it was clear that the Macedonians had gained the advantage in the war. After conferring with his cavalry commander, Menon of Pharsalus, Antiphilus therefore sent an embassy to Antipater the next day asking for terms. Antipater refused to conclude any general peace with the Athenian led alliance as a whole, insisting instead that each city send its own ambassadors. While these terms were at first rejected, the subsequent Macedonian capture of several Thessalian cities caused a rush of defections as each city strove to make a separate peace.

Athens, abandoned by her allies, was at last forced to surrender unconditionally. In the peace imposed by Antipater, the Athenians were forced to accept a Macedonian garrison as well as a replacement of democracy with an oligarchy under the leadership of Phocion.
