= Antipater =

Macedonian statesman and regent (4th century BC)

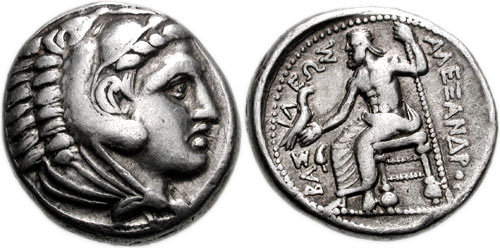
- Coinage of Alexander the Great, Amphipolis mint, struck under Antipater for Philip III Arrhidaeus, circa 322–320 BC.

Regent of Alexander's empire
- Reign: c. 321/320 – 319 BC
- Predecessor: Perdiccas
- Successor: Polyperchon

Regent of Macedon and Greece
- Reign: 334 – 319 BC
- Born: c. 400 BC
- Died: spring 319 BC (aged c. 81)
- Issue: Phila, Eurydice, Nicaea, Iollas, Cassander, Pleistarchus, Philip, Nicanor, Alexarchus, Perilaus
- Greek: Ἀντίπατρος
- House: Antipatrid dynasty
- Father: Iolaos of Macedon

Antipater (/ænˈtɪpətər/; Ancient Greek: Ἀντίπατρος, romanized: Antipatros, lit. 'like the father'; c. 400 BC – 319 BC) was a Macedonian general, regent and statesman under the successive kingships of Philip II of Macedon and his son, Alexander the Great. In the wake of the collapse of the Argead house, his son Cassander eventually ruled Macedonia as a king in his own right.

Probably active during the reign of Perdiccas III of Macedon, most of Antipater's political career was as one of Philip II's foremost Hetairoi. After Philip II's death, he helped Alexander secure the throne. When Alexander began his wars against the Persian Empire in 336 BC, Antipater remained behind to hold Macedon and Greece as regent. While Alexander was campaigning, Antipater crushed revolts, like that of King Agis III of Sparta, and managed Greek affairs. After the Death of Alexander the Great in 323 BC, Antipater was reconfirmed in his position as viceroy of Europe in the Partition of Babylon.

Antipater then became engaged in the Lamian War, where he was defeated in 322 BC and besieged at Lamia. He eventually escaped with the help of Leonnatus, and later, with the help of Craterus, finally defeated the Greeks at the Battle of Crannon. When he was informed of the regent Perdiccas' royal ambitions, Antipater joined a coalition with Ptolemy and Antigonus to overthrow Perdiccas in the First War of the Diadochi.

After Perdiccas' death in 321/320 BC, Antipater was elected regent of all of Alexander the Great's empire at the Partition of Triparadisus. He brought the two kings, Philip III Arrhidaeus and Alexander IV, back to Macedon, but died soon after in 319 BC. On his deathbed, Antipater chose an infantry officer named Polyperchon as his successor as regent instead of his son Cassander. Antipater's death and choice of successor initiated the Second War of the Diadochi, which would last 4 years and end with Cassander establishing control over Macedon, eventually founding the short-lived Antipatrid Dynasty.

== Family background and early career ==
=== Family background ===
Antipater belonged to the Macedonian noble house of Iolaos, which may have been serving the Argead Kings of Macedon since as early as 432 BC. Antipater and his family may have been distant collateral relatives to the Argead dynasty. Born in around 400 BC to a Macedonian nobleman called Iolaos, Antipater was originally from the Macedonian city of Paliura; had a brother called Cassander; was the paternal uncle of Cassander's child Antigone and was the maternal great uncle of Berenice I of Egypt. Antipater had eleven children (four daughters, seven sons) from various unknown wives. His daughters were:

- Phila, wife of Balacrus, Craterus and Demetrius I of Macedon
- Eurydice, wife of Ptolemy I Soter. Her son Meleager would rule Macedonia for two months in 279 BC
- Nicaea, wife of Perdiccas and Lysimachus
- The wife of Alexander of Lyncestis

His sons were:

- Iollas
- Cassander, King of Macedonia
- Pleistarchus, a general and governor in his brother's service.
- Phillip, also a military commander under his brother.
- Nicanor
- Alexarchus
- Perilaus

Antipater probably served politically and militarily under King Perdiccas III of Macedon, Philip II's predecessor, arising to a position of renown before Philip assumed the throne in 359 BC. According to the Sudas, Antipater left a compilation of letters in 2 books and a history, called The Illyrian Deeds of Perdikkas (Περδίκκου πράξεις Ιλλυριακαί). The Suas also suggest Antipater was a student of Aristotle, but this is unlikely since he was 15 years older with the relationship being one of a friend and a follower. Aristotle named him as executor-in-charge of his will, when he died in 322 BC.

=== Career under Philip II of Macedon ===
Through his service with Philip II, alongside Parmenion, Antipater became one of Philip's trusted advisors and a prominent Hetairoi, aiding in Philip's expansion of the Macedonian state. Antipater is known to have campaigned in Thrace against the Odrysian King Kersobleptes early in his career. In 342 BC, he was appointed by Philip to govern Macedon as his regent while the former left for three years of hard and successful campaigning against Thracian and Scythian tribes, which extended Macedonian rule as far as the Hellespont. In 342 BC, when the Athenians tried to assume control of the Euboean towns and expel the pro-Macedonian rulers, he sent Macedonian troops to stop them. In the late summer of the same year, Antipater went to Delphi, as Philip's representative (theoros) in the Amphictyonic League, a religious organization to which Macedon had been admitted in 346 BC; he attended the Pythian Games on Philip II's behalf.

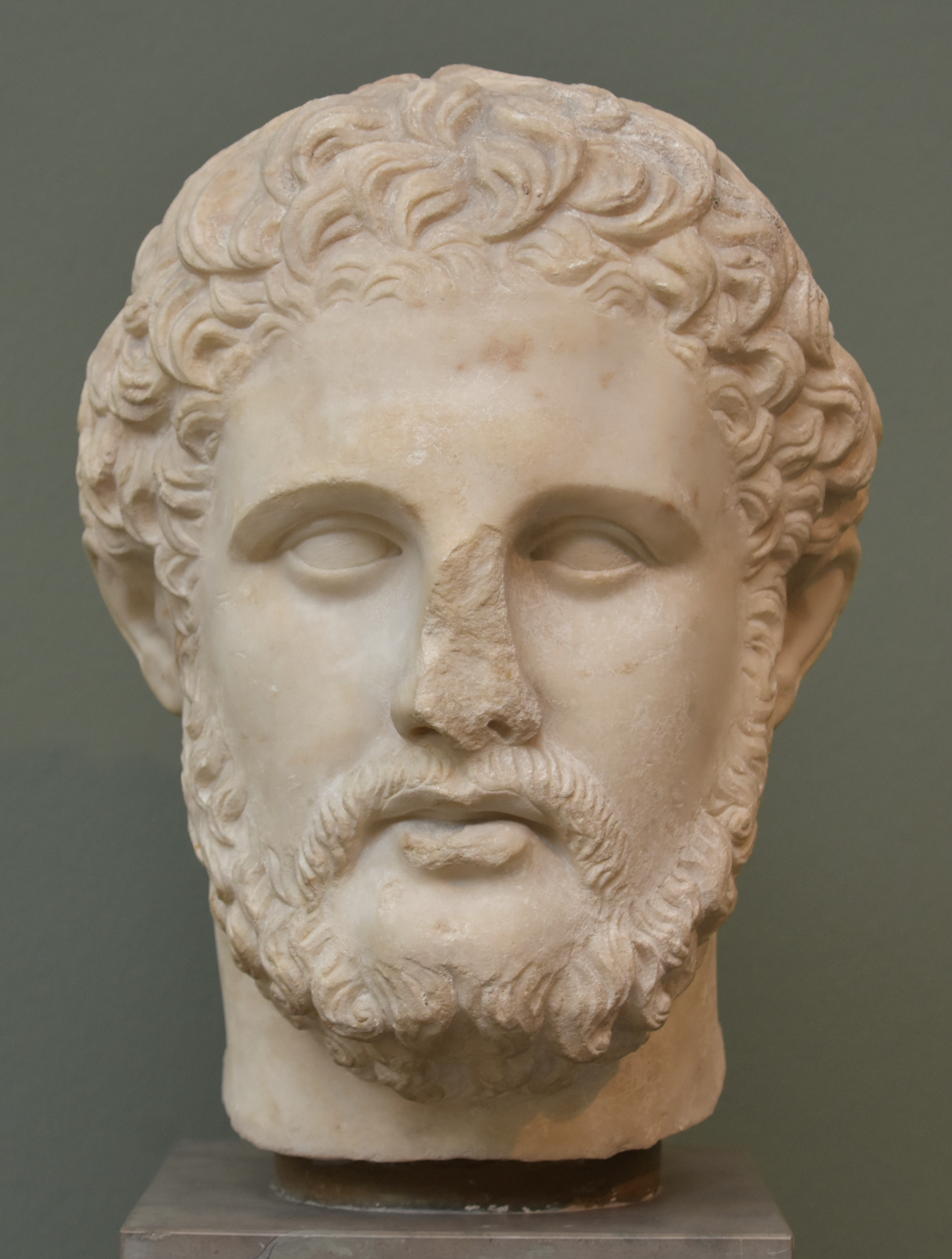
Bust depicting Philip II of Macedon, the father of Alexander the Great. Antipater was a right hand man to Philip II, often serving as regent when Philip was away on campaign.

When Thrace again threatened Macedon's northern border in 340 BC, Antipater campaigned in the area and turned over the regency to a teenage Alexander the Great. After the triumphal Macedonian victory at the Battle of Chaeronea in 338 BC, Antipater was sent as ambassador to Athens (337–336 BC) to negotiate a peace treaty and return the bones of the Athenians who had fallen in the battle. Antipater is known to have had a long-standing friendship with the Athenian statesman Phocion; it may originate from this visit or earlier interactions.

Antipater started as a great friend to both the young Alexander and the boy's mother, Olympias, and aided Alexander in the struggle to secure his succession after Philip's death, in 336 BC. He joined Parmenion in advising Alexander the Great not to set out on his Asiatic expedition until he had provided by marriage for the succession to the throne.

== Career under Alexander the Great ==
=== Regent of Macedon and Greece ===
On the Alexander's departure eastward in 334 BC, Antipater was left regent in Macedonia and made "general (strategos) of Europe", positions he held until 323/2 BC. The European front was to prove initially quite agitated, and Antipater also had to send reinforcements to the king, as he did while the king was at Gordium in the winter of 334–333 BC.

The Persian fleet under Memnon of Rhodes and Pharnabazus was apparently a considerable danger for Antipater, bringing war in the Aegean Sea and threatening war in Europe. Luckily for the regent, Memnon died during the siege of Mytilene on the isle of Lesbos and the remaining fleet dispersed in 333 BC, after Alexander's victory at the Battle of Issus. More dangerous enemies were nearer home; tribes in Thrace rebelled in 332 BC, led by Memnon of Thrace, the Macedonian governor of the region, followed shortly by the revolt of Agis III, king of Sparta. The Spartans, who were not members of the League of Corinth and had not participated in Alexander's expedition, saw in the Asian campaign the long-awaited chance to take back control over the Peloponnese after the disastrous defeats at the Battle of Leuctra and Battle of Mantinea. The Persians generously funded Sparta's ambitions, making possible the formation of an army 20,000 strong. After assuming virtual control of Crete, Agis tried to build an anti-Macedonian front. While Athens remained neutral, the Achaeans, Arcadians and Elis became his allies, with the important exception of Megalopolis, the staunchly anti-Spartan capital of Arcadia. In 331 BC Agis started to besiege the city with his entire army, forcing Antipater to act.

==== Spartan rebellion of King Agis III ====
So as not to have two enemies simultaneously, Antipater pardoned Memnon and even let him keep his office in Thrace, while great sums of money were sent to him by Alexander. This helped to create, with Thessalian help and many mercenaries, a force double that of Agis, which Antipater in person led south in 330 BC to confront the Spartans. In the spring of that year, the two armies clashed in the Battle of Megalopolis. Agis fell with many of his best soldiers, but not without inflicting heavy losses on the Macedonians. Utterly defeated, the Spartans sued for peace; the latter's answer was to negotiate directly with the League of Corinth, but the Spartan emissaries preferred to treat directly with Alexander, who imposed on Sparta's allies a penalty of 120 talents and the entrance of Sparta in the league.

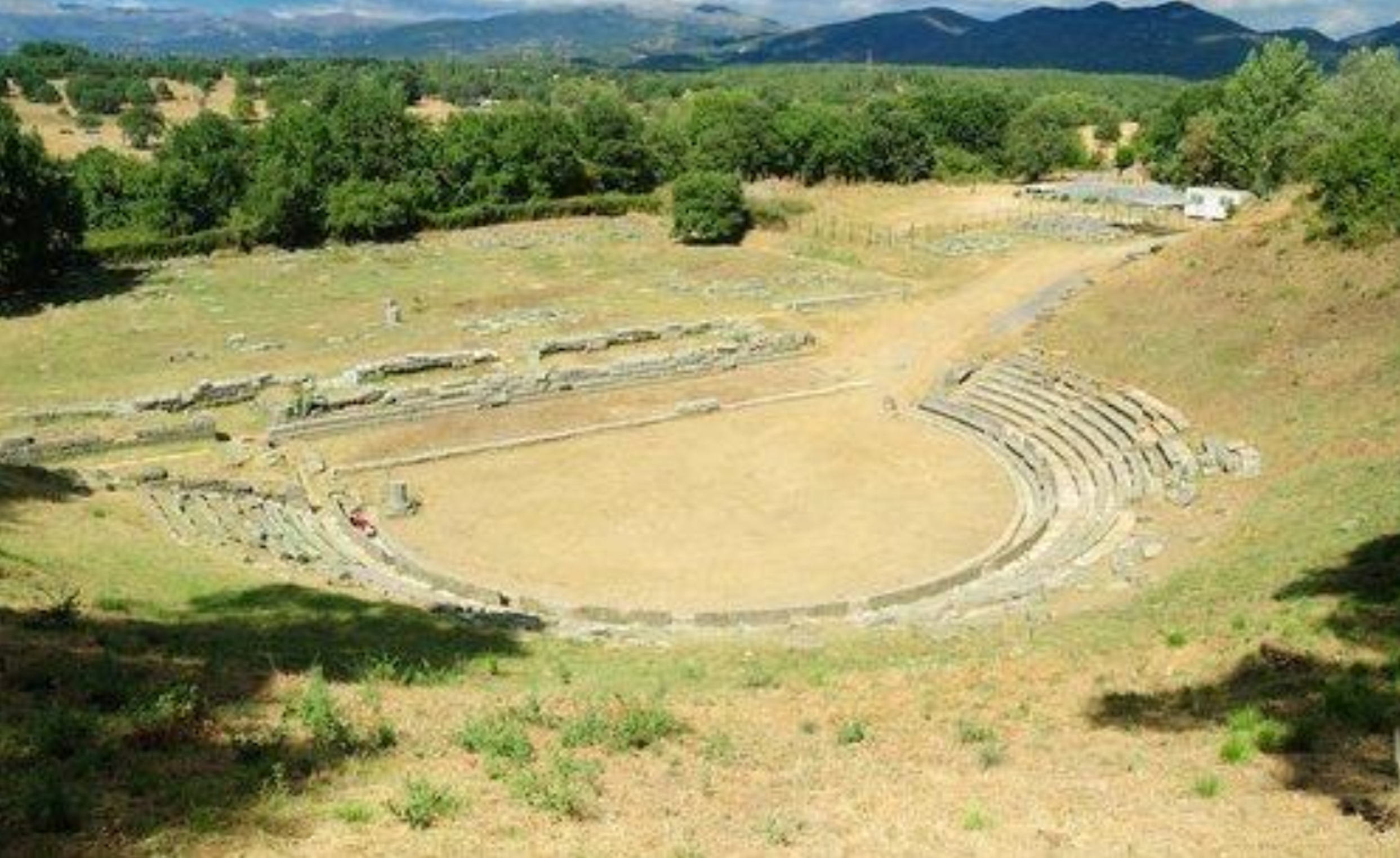
Image of a theater in Megalopolis. Alexander' the Great's response to Antipater's victory over Agis III at the Battle of Megalopolis was to proclaim that "while we have been conquering Darius here, there has been a battle of mice in Arcadia".

Alexander appears to have been quite jealous of Antipater's victory; according to Plutarch, the king wrote in a letter to his viceroy: "It seems, my friends that while we have been conquering Darius here, there has been a battle of mice in Arcadia". Antipater was disliked for supporting oligarchs and tyrants in Greece, but he also worked with the League of Corinth, built by Philip. In addition, his previously close relationship with the ambitious Olympias greatly deteriorated. Whether from jealousy or from the necessity of guarding against the evil consequences of the dissension between Olympias and Antipater, in 324 BC, Alexander ordered the latter to lead fresh troops into Asia, while Craterus, in charge of discharged veterans returning home, was appointed to take over the regency in Macedon. When Alexander suddenly died in Babylon in 323 BC however, Antipater was able to forestall the transfer of power.

Some later historians, such as Justin in his Historia Philippicae et Totius Mundi Origines et Terrae Situs blamed Antipater for the death of Alexander, accusing him of murdering him through poison. However, this view is disputed by most historians and Alexander is believed to have died of natural causes.

== Role in the Lamian and Diadochi Wars ==
The new regent, Perdiccas, left Antipater in control of Greece. Antipater faced wars with Athens, Aetolia, and Thessaly that made up the Lamian War, in which southern Greeks attempted to re-assert their political autonomy.

=== Lamian War ===
At the onset of this struggle, the southern Greeks held an apparently decisive numerical advantage, fielding an army of some 25000 troops. Antipater's levies numbered a meager 13000; drawn from a manpower pool that had been severely diminished by the campaigns of Alexander the Great. Furthermore, the southern Greek coalition was led by a talented general and one-time mercenary named Leosthenes, who had fought under Alexander and had seen first-hand the functions of the Macedonian war machine. An initial engagement with this coalition around the historic pass of Thermopylae saw Antipater's Thessalian cavalry defect to the opposing side. Already outnumbered and now without a cavalry contingent, Antipater fought a token battle but was ultimately defeated and forced to retreat north to the Thessalian city of Lamia. Behind its stout defenses he endured a siege. By some unknown means he began desperately passing correspondence to would-be allies through the Athenian siege lines. In 322 BC he was relieved when Leonnatus, the satrap of Hellespontine Phrygia, responded to his call for aid and arrived in southern Thessaly with a force to break the investment.

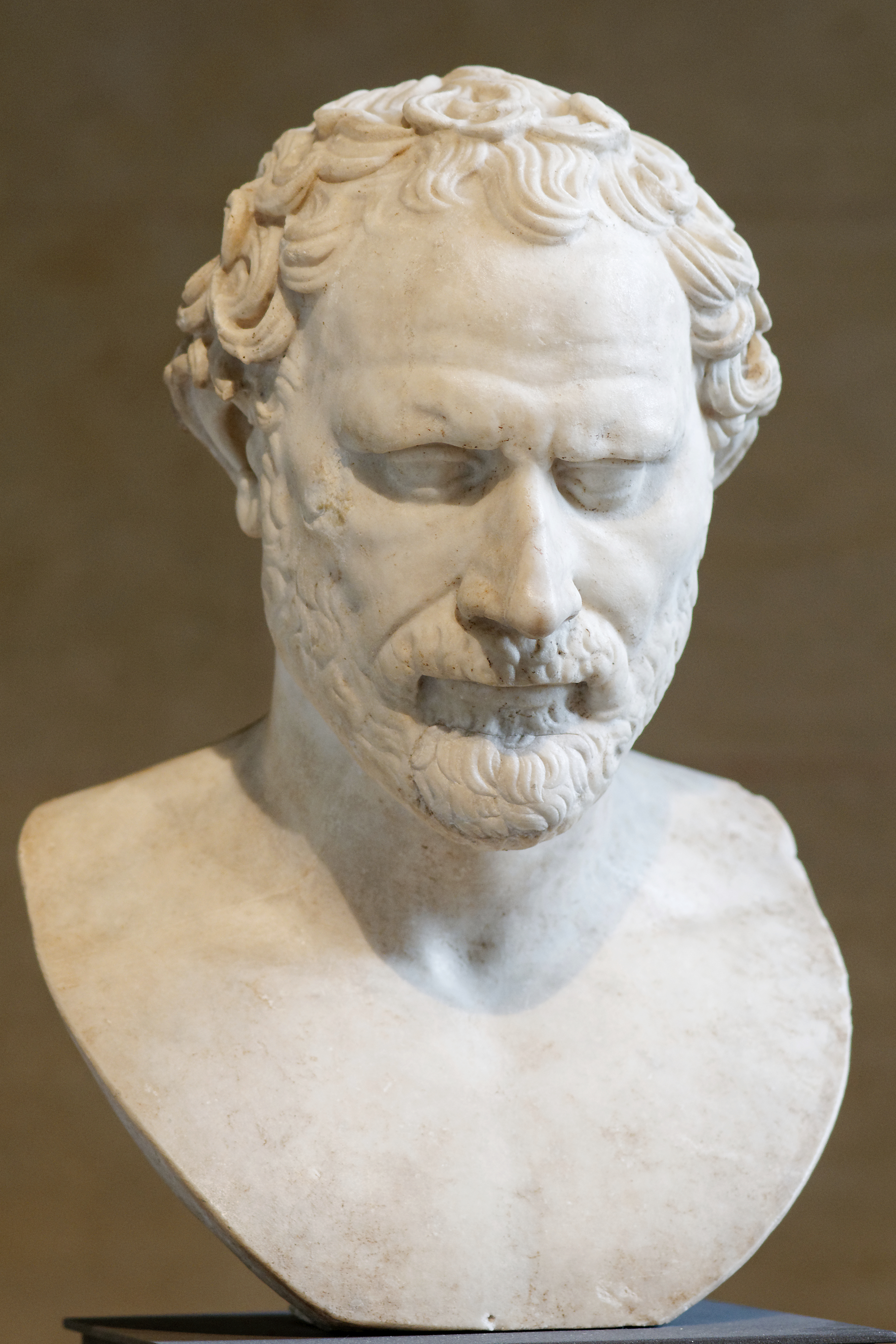
Demosthenes the Orator was a staunchly anti-Macedonian Athenian statesman. When Antipater won the Lamian War and demanded his surrender, Demosthenes committed suicide.

Although Leonnatus fell in the ensuing battle, the Athenian coalition had been forced to use the entirety of its dwindling army (many of the Aetolian and Thessalian contingents having left the siege to tend to the harvest) to face him. Leonnatus' infantry retreated into rough country where the Aetolian and Thessalian cavalry could not pursue them, and survived the debacle largely unscathed. This turn of events allowed Antipater to slip out of the walls of Lamia before striking north for Macedonia, where he awaited the arrival of further reinforcements from Asia. Along the way he assumed control of Leonnatus' infantry corps, absorbing them into the remnants of his initial army.

Craterus, another decorated general, had also received Antipater's call for aid and arrived at Pella with a force of 16000 discharged veterans who had marched and fought under Alexander. The two generals made common cause, and to cement this new alliance Antipater married his daughter Phila to Craterus. The two then led a massive, combined force south to fight a final, decisive battle against the southern Greeks. Antipater defeated them at the Battle of Crannon in 322 BC, with Craterus' help, and broke up the coalition. At a peace treaty in the ruined city of Thebes, Antipater negotiated with an Athenian delegation led by Phocion and Demades. Here he imposed a rule of oligarchy upon Athens and demanded the surrender of Demosthenes and Hypereides (the foremost instigators of the revolt), the former committing suicide to escape capture, while the latter was imprisoned before having his tongue ripped from his mouth in a brutal execution. Antipater's settlement extended across the rest of Greece, where he installed or confirmed oligarchies loyal to Macedon. He entrusted the Peloponnese to Deinarchus, a leading figure of the pro-Macedonian oligarchy at Corinth and a veteran of Timoleon's expedition to Sicily. That the post went to a Corinthian citizen rather than a Macedonian, and that Corinth escaped the imposition of a tyrant, suggests the city was left a measure of internal autonomy in recognition of its loyalty during the war.

=== First War of the Diadochi ===
Later in the same year, Antipater and Craterus were engaged in a mopping-up campaign against recalcitrant pockets of Aetolian resurgence when they received the news from Antigonus in Asia Minor that Perdiccas contemplated making himself outright ruler of the empire. Antipater and Craterus accordingly concluded peace with the Aetolians (much to the chagrin of future of Macedonian rulers) and went to war against Perdiccas, allying themselves with Ptolemy, the satrap of Egypt. Antipater married another of his daughters (Eurydike) to Ptolemy to strengthen this new alliance. Together with Craterus and his son Cassander, he then crossed over into Asia at the head of a considerable force in 321 BC. While in Phrygia, this army was divided in two; one under Craterus marching east into Cappadocia to face Eumenes, while the later under Antipater struck south to fight Perdiccas. While still in Syria, Antipater received two letters that drastically changed the power dynamic of the successor struggle at that point; firstly that Perdiccas had been murdered by his own soldiers in Egypt, and secondly that in one of the greatest upsets of the Hellenistic age, Craterus had fallen in battle against Eumenes (Diodorus xviii. 25–39).

== Regent of the empire, death, and succession ==
In the Partition of Triparadisus (321 BC), Antipater participated in a new division of Alexander's great kingdom. He appointed himself supreme regent of all Alexander's empire and was left in Greece as guardian of Alexander's son Alexander IV and his disabled brother Philip III. Having quelled a mutiny of his troops and commissioned Antigonus to continue the war against Eumenes and the other partisans of Perdiccas, Antipater returned to Macedonia, arriving there in 320 BC (Justin xiii. 6). Soon after, he was seized by an illness which terminated his active career.

Antipater died of old age in 319 BC, at the age of 81. By his side was his son Cassander, who later became king of Macedonia. Controversially, Antipater did not appoint Cassander to succeed him as regent, citing as the reason for his decision Cassander's relative youth (at the time of Antipater's passing, Cassander was 36). Over Cassander, Antipater chose the aged officer Polyperchon as regent.

Cassander became indignant at this, believing that he'd earned the right to become regent by virtue of his loyalty and experience. Thus he appealed to general Antigonus to assist him in battling Polyperchon for the position. In 317 BC, after two years of war with Polyperchon, Cassander emerged victorious. Cassander would go on to rule Macedonia for nineteen years, first as regent and later as king, ultimately founding the Antipatrid dynasty.

== Legacy ==
=== Character ===
Antipater's long career under three successive kings was first and foremost as a supporter of Macedon and a "caretaker of Macedonian affairs"; although his tenure as viceroy earned Antipater the fear and respect of many, it is generally agreed upon that unlike many other Successors he had little interest in the affairs of Asia and no firm claim, or interest, in supreme power. Generally, Antipater's loyalty to the Argeads and his refusal to transfer the regency to his own children is seen as proof that he was a loyal Macedonian who put his homeland before his interests.

=== Political legacy ===
Antipater's death by prolonged illness and choice of successor would lead to the Second War of the Diadochi. Olympias, when she came to power in Macedon briefly in 317 BC, opened the grave of Antipater's son Iollas and scattered his ashes. She may not have done the same to Antipater's grave due to "respect for Macedonian public opinion". Antipater's death and the transferring of the regency to Polyperchon weakened the central authority of Alexander's empire even further, as Polyperchon lacked much of Antipater's standing. Accordingly, the death of Antipater was a signal to many of the satraps and generals in Asia and Greece to start pursuing their own ambitions. Polyperchon moved rapidly against the men Antipater had placed in power, proclaiming the restoration of the cities' earlier constitutions and the overthrow of the oligarchies his predecessor had established. Among those who fell was Deinarchus of Corinth, Antipater's epimeletes of the Peloponnese, whom Polyperchon had seized, tortured and executed in 318.

== Bibliography ==
=== Ancient sources ===
- Arrian. The Anabasis of Alexander – via gutenberg.org.
- Diodorus (1947) [1st century BC]. "Books XVIII, XIX". Library of History. Loeb Classical Library. Vol. 9. Translated by Perrin, Bernadotte – via LacusCurtius.
- Plutarch (1919) [2nd century AD]. "Life of Demosthenes". Parallel Lives. Loeb Classical Library. Vol. 8. Translated by Perrin, Bernadotte. OCLC 40115288 – via LacusCurtius.
- Plutarch (1919) [2nd century AD]. "Life of Phocion". Parallel Lives. Loeb Classical Library. Vol. 8. Translated by Perrin, Bernadotte. OCLC 40115288 – via LacusCurtius.
- Polyaenus (1793). "Book 4, 6 & 8". Strategems. Translated by Shepherd, R. – via Attalus.org.
- Photius. "92. [Arrian, Continuation]". Bibliotheca or Myrobiblion – via tertullian.org.
- Quintus Curtius Rufus. The History of Alexander the Great.
- Justinus (1853). "Book 13-14". Epitome of Pompeius Trogus' Philippic Histories. Translated by Watson, J.S. – via Attalus.org.

=== Modern sources ===
- Anson, Edward M. (2014). Alexander's Heirs: The Age of the Successors. John Wiley & Sons. ISBN 9781444339628.
- Billows, Richard A. (1990). Antigonos the One-eyed and the creation of the Hellenistic state. University of California Press. ISBN 9780520208803.
- Bosworth, A.B. (2005). The Legacy of Alexander: Politics, Warfare, and Propaganda under the Successors. Oxford University Press. ISBN 9780198153061.
- Grainger, John (2019). Antipater's Dynasty. Pen and Sword Military. ISBN 978152673-0886.
- Green, Peter (1990). Alexander to Actium: The Historical Evolution of the Hellenistic Age. University of California Press. ISBN 9780520083493.
- Dixon, Michael D. (2014). Late Classical and Early Hellenistic Corinth, 338–196 B.C. Routledge Monographs in Classical Studies. London and New York: Routledge. ISBN 978-1-315-77180-9.
- Heckel, Waldemar (2006). Who's Who in the Age of Alexander the Great: Prosopography of Alexander's Empire. Blackwell Publishing. ISBN 9781405112109.
- Heckel, Waldemar (2016). Alexander's Marshals A Study of the Makedonian Aristocracy and the Politics of Military Leadership. Routledge, Taylor & Francis. ISBN 9781138934696.
- Roisman, Joseph (2012). Alexander's Veterans and the Early Wars of the Successors. University of Texas Press, Austin. ISBN 9780292735965.
- Romm, James (2011). Ghost on the Throne. Alfred A. Knoff: Random House. ISBN 9780307701503.
- Waterfield, Robin (2011). Dividing the Spoils. Oxford University Press. ISBN 9780195395235.

| Preceded by Peithon and Arrhidaeus | Regent of Macedon; 320–319 BC | Succeeded by Polyperchon |
