= Alexander the Great =

King of Macedon from 336 to 323 BC

- Basileus
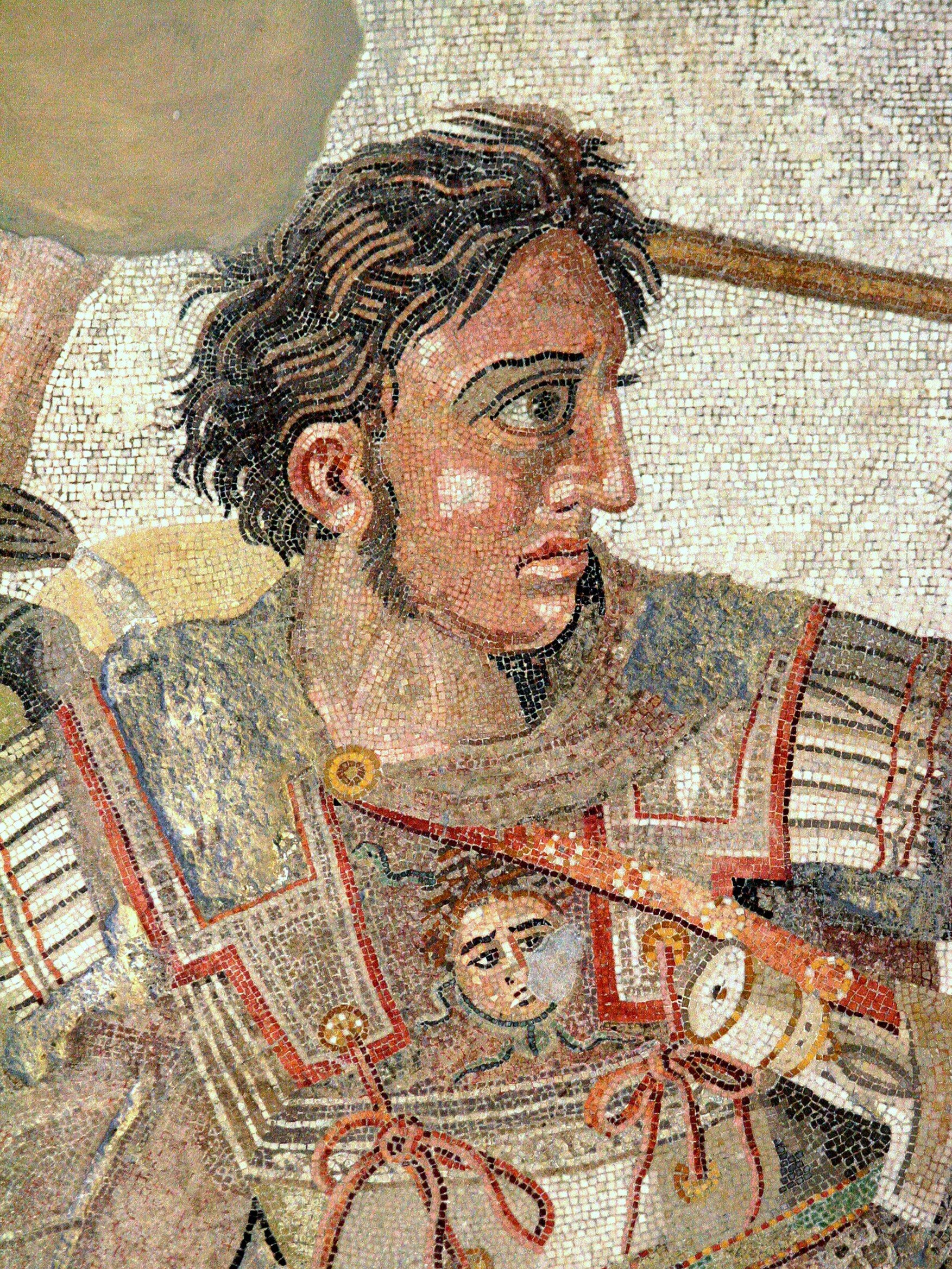
- Detail from the Alexander Mosaic (created c. 120–100 BC)

King of Macedon
- Reign: October 336 – June 323 BC
- Predecessor: Philip II
- Successor: Philip III

Hegemon of the Hellenic League, Strategos Autokrator of Greece
- Reign: 336–323 BC
- Predecessor: Philip II
- Successor: Demetrius I

Pharaoh of Egypt
- Reign: 332–323 BC
- Predecessor: Darius III
- Successor: Philip III

King of Persia
- Reign: 330–323 BC
- Predecessor: Darius III
- Successor: Philip III
- Born: 20 or 21 July 356 BC; Pella, Macedon
- Died: 10 or 11 June 323 BC (aged 32); Babylon, Macedonian Empire
- Burial: Unlocated
- Spouse: Roxana; Stateira; Parysatis
- Issue: 3, including: Alexander IV and; Heracles
- Greek: Ἀλέξανδρος (Note: The name Ἀλέξανδρος derives from the Greek verb ἀλέξω (aléxō, lit. 'ward off, avert, defend') and ἀνδρ- (andr-), the stem of ἀνήρ (anḗr, lit. 'man'), and means "protector of men".)
- Dynasty: Argead
- Father: Philip II of Macedon
- Mother: Olympias of Epirus
- Religion: Ancient Greek religion
- Military career
- Conflicts: Wars of Philip II of Macedon; Battle of Chaeronea; Wars of Alexander the Great; Balkan campaign of Alexander the Great; Battle of Mount Haemus; Siege of Pelium; Battle of Thebes; Persian campaign of Alexander the Great; Battle of the Granicus; Siege of Miletus; Siege of Halicarnassus; Battle of Issus; Siege of Tyre; Siege of Gaza; Battle of Gaugamela; Battle of the Uxian Defile; Battle of the Persian Gate; Central Asian campaign of Alexander the Great; Siege of Cyropolis; Battle of Jaxartes; Siege of the Sogdian Rock; Indian campaign of Alexander the Great; Cophen campaign; Battle of the Hydaspes; Mallian campaign

Alexander III of Macedon (Ancient Greek: Ἀλέξανδρος, romanized: Aléxandros; 20/21 July 356 BC – 10/11 June 323 BC), most commonly known as Alexander the Great, (Note: The first known person to call Alexander "the Great" was a Roman playwright named Plautus (254–184 BC) in his play Mostellaria.) was king of the ancient Greek kingdom of Macedon (Note: Macedon was an Ancient Greek polity; the Macedonians were a Greek tribe.) from 336 BC until his death. He spent most of his reign conducting a lengthy military campaign throughout Asia and Egypt, and by the age of 30, he had created one of the largest empires in history, stretching from Greece to Egypt and northwestern India. He was undefeated in battle (Note: In the Battle of the Polytimetus of 329 BC, the Macedonian corps was defeated and its commanders killed. Although Alexander was not present in that battle, the defeat is partially attributed to his mistaken decision to put an inexperienced person among the corps' commanders.) and is widely considered to be one of history's greatest and most successful military commanders.

Alexander was born in Pella, Macedon, to King Philip II and his fourth wife, Olympias. He was tutored by the philosopher and polymath Aristotle until the age of 16. Alexander ascended the throne at the age of 20 after his father was assassinated. Shortly afterward, he launched a campaign in the Balkans and reasserted control over Thrace and parts of Illyria before capturing and destroying the city of Thebes. Alexander then assumed leadership of the League of Corinth, created by his father.

Alexander launched a pan-Hellenic invasion of the Achaemenid Persian Empire in 334 BC, and with it began a series of campaigns which lasted for ten years. Following his conquest of Asia Minor and a series of decisive battles, particularly at Issus and Gaugamela, he diminished the power of the Achaemenid Empire, subsequently overthrowing its ruler Darius III and conquering the entire empire. (Note: By the time of his death, he had conquered the entire Achaemenid Persian Empire, adding it to Macedon's European territories; according to some modern writers, this was most of the world then known to the ancient Greeks (the 'Ecumene'). An approximate view of the world known to Alexander can be seen in Hecataeus of Miletus's map; see Hecataeus world map.) After the fall of Persia, the Macedonian Empire held a vast swath of territory between the Adriatic Sea and the Indus River. Alexander endeavored to reach the "ends of the world and the Great Outer Sea" and invaded India in 326 BC, achieving an important victory over Porus, an Indian king of present-day Punjab, at the Battle of the Hydaspes. Facing mutiny from his troops, he was eventually forced to turn back at the Beas River, and later died in 323 BC in Babylon, Mesopotamia, the city which he had planned to make the capital of his empire, while on his return to Greece.

In the years following Alexander's death, a series of civil wars broke out across the Macedonian Empire, eventually leading to its disintegration at the hands of the Diadochi and beginning the Hellenistic period. Through his conquests, Alexander built a legacy that includes cultural diffusion and syncretism, which gave rise to Greco-Buddhism and Hellenistic Judaism. He founded more than twenty cities, the most prominent being Alexandria in Egypt. Alexander's establishment of Greek colonies and the spreading of Greek culture led to Hellenistic civilization became a major force in the ancient world, influencing regions as far east as the Indian subcontinent. The Hellenistic period developed through the Roman Empire into modern Western culture; the Greek language became the region's lingua franca and was the predominant language of the Byzantine Empire until its collapse in 1453 AD. Alexander became a legendary hero similar to Achilles, and his military achievements and successes in battle made him the touchstone against which later Greek and non-Greek military leaders would judge themselves. (Note: For instance, Hannibal supposedly ranked Alexander as the greatest general; Julius Caesar wept on seeing a statue of Alexander, since he had achieved so little by the same age; Pompey and Alauddin Khalji consciously posed as the 'new Alexander'; the young Napoleon Bonaparte also encouraged comparisons with Alexander. Napoleon also placed Alexander in the first rank. Caracalla believed himself to be the actual reincarnation of Alexander. Caligula wore the breastplate of Alexander in order to show his power. Fidel Castro's hero was Alexander the Great, whose Spanish equivalent Alejandro he adopted as his nom de guerre. Among Ottoman sultans, Mehmed II's heroes were Alexander and Achilles. In a letter to his rival, Selim I, while equating himself with Alexander, compares Ismail I as "Darius of our days". Paolo Giovio, in a work written for Charles V, says that Selim holds Alexander the Great and Julius Caesar in the highest esteem above all the generals of old.) His tactics remain a significant subject of study in military academies worldwide. Legends of Alexander's exploits were coalesced into the 3rd century Alexander Romance which, in the premodern period, went through over one hundred recensions, translations, and derivations and was translated into almost every European vernacular and every language of the Islamic world.

== Early life ==
=== Lineage and childhood ===
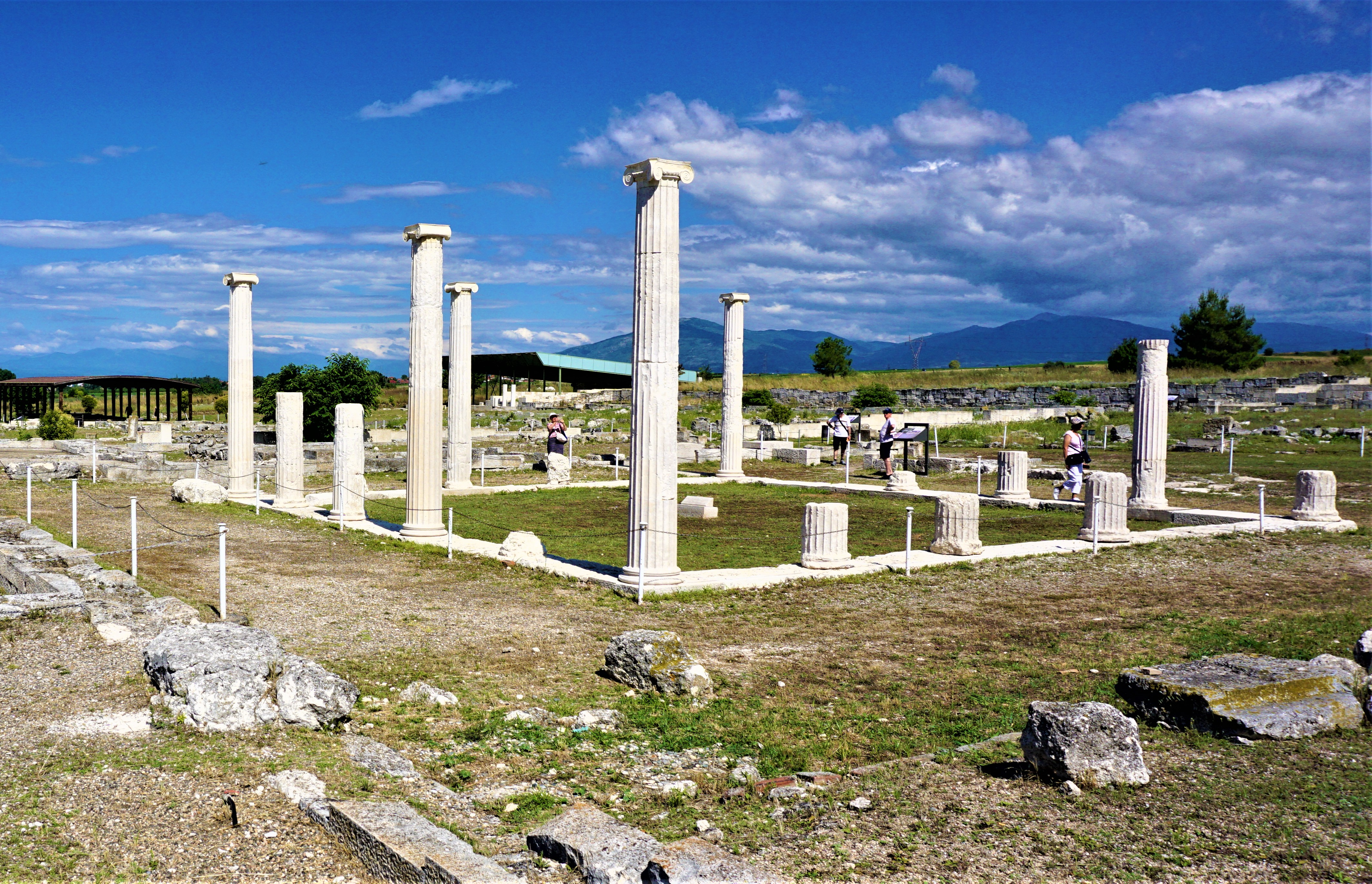
Archaeological site of Pella, Greece, Alexander's birthplace

Alexander III was born in Pella, the capital of the Kingdom of Macedon, on the sixth day of the month of Hekatombaion, which probably corresponds to 20 July 356 BC. He was the son of Philip II, a king from the Argead dynasty, and his fourth wife, Olympias, daughter of King Neoptolemus I of Epirus. (Note: In ancient historiography, the Argead dynasty was traditionally regarded as having originated from Argos. The Argeads themselves claimed Argive Greek descent from the hero Temenus. Through his parents' genealogy, ancient authors traced Alexander's descent back to heroes and other legendary figures from Greek mythology, such as Heracles and Achilles.) Although Philip had seven or eight wives, Olympias was his principal wife for some time, likely because she gave birth to Alexander.

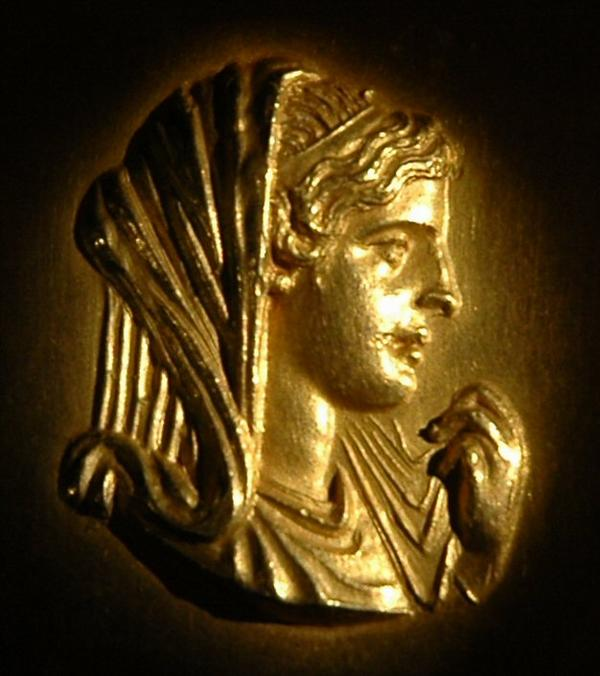
Roman medallion depicting Olympias, Alexander's mother

Several legends surround Alexander's birth and childhood. According to the ancient Greek biographer Plutarch, on the eve of the consummation of her marriage to Philip, Olympias dreamed that her womb was struck by a thunderbolt that caused a flame to erupt before dying away. Sometime after the wedding, Philip reportedly saw himself, in a dream, securing his wife's womb with a seal engraved with a lion's image. Plutarch suggested that Olympias was pregnant before her marriage or that Alexander's father was Zeus. Ancient commentators debated whether Olympias encouraged the story of Alexander's divine parentage; some said that she dismissed the suggestion as impious. Despite this, Alexander claimed descent through his father from Caranus of Macedon, a supposed descendant of Heracles and Perseus, and through his mother from the warrior Achilles and his son Neoptolemus.

On the day his son was born, as Philip prepared a siege on the coastal city of Potidea, he received news that his general Parmenion had defeated the combined Illyrian and Paeonian armies and that his horses had won at the Olympic Games. The Temple of Artemis in Ephesus reportedly also burnt down on this day; Hegesias of Magnesia claimed that Artemis was away attending the birth of Alexander. Such legends may have emerged when Alexander was king, and possibly at his instigation, to show that he was superhuman and destined for greatness from conception.

In his early years, Alexander was raised by a nurse, Lanike, sister of Alexander's future general Cleitus the Black. Later in his childhood, Alexander was tutored by the strict Leonidas, a relative of his mother, and by Lysimachus of Acarnania. Alexander was raised in the manner of noble Macedonian youths, learning to read, play the lyre, ride, fight, and hunt. When Alexander was ten, a trader from Thessaly offered to sell Philip a horse for thirteen talents. The horse refused to be mounted, and Philip ordered it away. Detecting that the horse feared its own shadow, Alexander asked to tame it and eventually succeeded. Plutarch stated that Philip, overjoyed at this display of courage and ambition, kissed his son tearfully, declaring: "My boy, you must find a kingdom big enough for your ambitions. Macedon is too small for you", and bought the horse for him. Alexander named it Bucephalas, meaning "ox-head". Bucephalas carried Alexander as far as modern-day India. When Bucephalas died at age 30, Alexander named a city after him, Bucephala.

=== Education ===
When Alexander was 13, Philip sought a tutor, and considered such academics as Isocrates and Speusippus, the latter offering to resign from his stewardship of the Academy to become Alexander's tutor. In the end, Philip chose Aristotle and provided the Temple of the Nymphs at Mieza as a classroom. In return for teaching Alexander, Philip agreed to rebuild Aristotle's hometown of Stageira, which Philip had razed, and to repopulate it by buying and freeing the ex-citizens who were slaves, or pardoning those who were in exile.

Mieza was like a boarding school for Alexander and the children of Macedonian nobles, such as Ptolemy, Hephaestion, and Cassander. Many of these students became his friends and generals, and are called the "Companions". Aristotle taught Alexander and his companions about medicine, philosophy, morals, religion, logic, and art. Under Aristotle's tutelage, Alexander developed a passion for the works of Homer, and particularly the Iliad, of which Aristotle gave him an annotated copy that he later carried on campaign. Alexander could quote Euripides from memory. According to Suda, Anaximenes of Lampsacus was one of Alexander's teachers and accompanied him on his campaigns.

In his youth, Alexander met Persian exiles at Philip II's court who received his protection as they opposed King Artaxerxes III. Among them were Artabazos II and his daughter Barsine, possible future mistress of Alexander, who resided at the Macedonian court from 352 to 342 BC, as well as Alexander's future satrap (Persian governor) Amminapes and a nobleman named Sisines. This informed the Macedonian court of Persian issues, and may have influenced how Philip ran his government.

== Heir of Philip II ==
=== Regency and ascent of Macedon ===
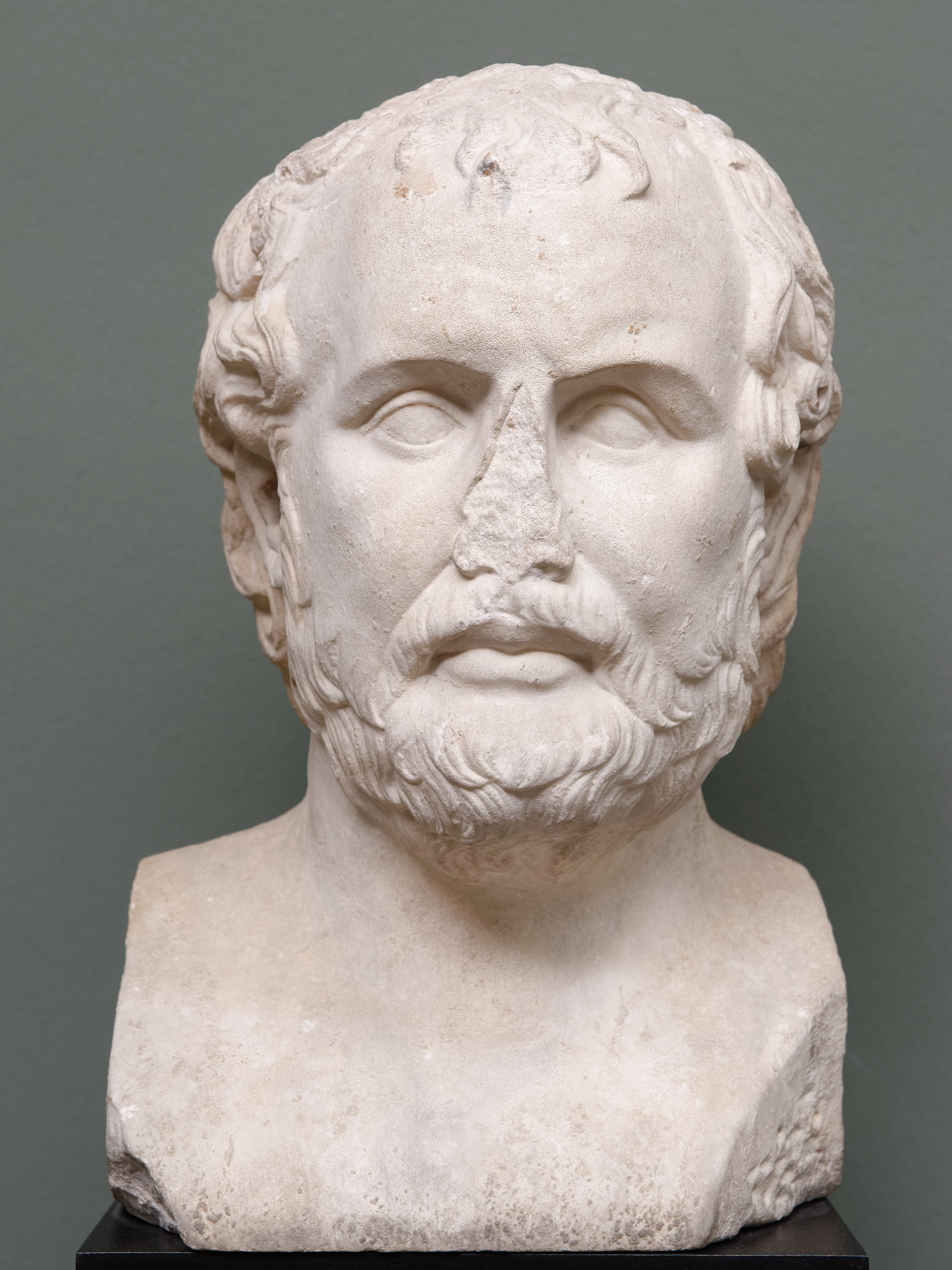
Philip II of Macedon, Alexander's father

At the age of 16, Alexander's education under Aristotle ended. While his father fought the Thracians to the north, Alexander governed as regent and heir apparent. During Philip's absence, the Thracian tribe of Maedi revolted against Macedonia. Alexander quickly drove them from their territory, which he colonized, founding the city of Alexandropolis.

When Philip returned, he sent his son with a small force to subdue the revolts in southern Thrace. Campaigning against the Greek city of Perinthus, Alexander reportedly saved his father's life. Meanwhile, the city of Amphissa began to work lands sacred to Apollo near Delphi, a sacrilege that gave Philip the opportunity to further intervene in Greek affairs. While Philip was occupied in Thrace, Alexander was ordered to muster an army for a campaign in southern Greece. Concerned that other Greek states might intervene, Alexander made it look as though he was preparing to attack Illyria instead. During this turmoil, the Illyrians invaded Macedonia, only to be repelled by Alexander.

Philip and his army joined his son in 338 BC, and they marched south through Thermopylae, taking it after stubborn resistance from its Theban garrison. They went on to occupy the city of Elatea, only a few days' march from both Athens and Thebes. The Athenians, led by Demosthenes, voted to ally with Thebes against Macedonia. Both Athens and Philip sent embassies to win Thebes's favour, but Athens won the contest. Philip marched on Amphissa (ostensibly acting on the request of the Amphictyonic League), capturing Demosthenes's mercenaries and accepting the city's surrender. He returned to Elatea, sending a final offer of peace to Athens and Thebes, who both rejected it.

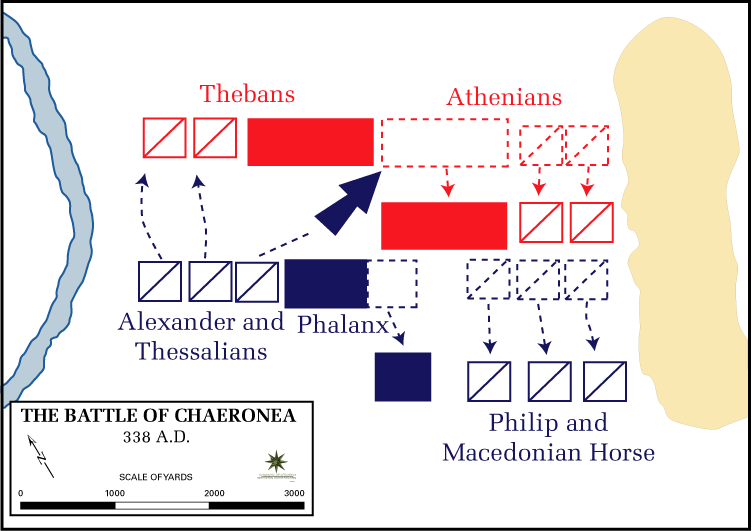
Battle plan from the Battle of Chaeronea

As Philip marched south, his opponents blocked him near Chaeronea, Boeotia. At the Battle of Chaeronea, Philip commanded the right wing and his generals and Alexander led the left. According to the ancient sources, the two sides fought bitterly for some time. Philip deliberately commanded his troops to retreat, counting on the untested Athenian hoplites to follow, thus breaking their line. Alexander was the first to break the Theban lines, followed by Philip's generals. Having damaged the enemy's cohesion, Philip ordered his troops to press forward and quickly routed them. With the Athenians lost, the Thebans were surrounded and defeated.

Following their victory at Chaeronea, Philip and Alexander marched unopposed into the Peloponnese, devastating much of Laconia and ejecting the Spartans from various parts of it. At Corinth, Philip established a "Hellenic Alliance" (modelled on the old anti-Persian alliance of the Greco-Persian Wars), which included most Greek city-states except Sparta. Philip was then named Hegemon (often translated as "Supreme Commander") of this league (known by modern scholars as the League of Corinth), and announced his plans to attack the Persian Empire.

=== Exile and return ===
After Philip returned to Pella, he married Cleopatra Eurydice, the niece of his general Attalus. The marriage threatened Alexander's position as heir, since any son of Cleopatra Eurydice would be a fully Macedonian heir, while Alexander was only half-Macedonian. During the wedding banquet, a drunken Attalus publicly prayed to the gods that the union would produce a legitimate heir. Angered by Attalus's comment, Alexander engaged in a quarrel with him and Philip; Plutarch claims that Philip almost killed his son. (Note: Concerning the feud at Philip II's wedding to Cleopatra Eurydice, Plutarch writes: "At the wedding of Cleopatra, whom Philip fell in love with and married, she being much too young for him, her uncle Attalus in his drink desired the Macedonians would implore the gods to give them a lawful successor to the kingdom by his niece. This so irritated Alexander that throwing one of the cups at his head, 'You villain,' said he, 'what, am I then a bastard?' Then Philip, taking Attalus's part, rose up and would have run his son through; but by good fortune for them both, either his over-hasty rage, or the wine he had drunk, made his foot slip, so that he fell down on the floor, at which Alexander reproachfully insulted him: 'See there,' said he, 'the man who makes preparations to pass out of Europe into Asia, overturned in passing from one seat to another.'")

In 337 BC, Alexander fled Macedon with his mother Olympias, leaving her with her brother, King Alexander I of Epirus, in the Molossian capital Dodona. He continued to Illyria seeking refuge with one or more Illyrian kings, perhaps with Glaucias, and was treated as a guest, despite having defeated them in battle a few years before. However, it appears Philip never intended to disown his politically and militarily trained son. After six months, Alexander returned to Macedon through the mediation of a family friend, Demaratus.

The following year, the Persian satrap of Caria, Pixodarus, offered his eldest daughter to Philip's oldest son, Arrhidaeus, who was mentally disabled, possibly as the result of poisoning by Olympias. Olympias and several friends of her son feared that Philip intended to make Arrhidaeus his heir. According to Plutarch, Alexander reacted by sending an actor, Thessalus of Corinth, to tell Pixodarus that he should offer his daughter's hand to Alexander, not to Arrhidaeus, whom Alexander labelled in the message as illegitimate (Note: Arrhidaeus was a legitimate son of Philip II, born from his marriage to Phillina of Larissa. Daniel Ogden attributes allegations about Phillina having been only a concubine and Arrhidaeus's illegitimacy to "the colourful propaganda generated in the jostle for power and succession between Phillina and her son on the one side, and Philip's other wives and their children on the other. ... It is implied [by authors favouring Alexander's claim to the throne] either that she [Phillina] was of insufficient status to be mother to the heir, and so challenged Arrhidaeus' claim to succeed in that fashion, or, more directly, it attempted to deny that Arrhidaeus was the son of Philip, or at any rate to call his paternity into question: how could one be sure who his father was, if his mother had been held in common?") and mentally unstable. When Philip heard of Alexander's taunt, he stopped the negotiations and scolded Alexander, explaining that he wanted something better than a Carian bride for him. Philip exiled four of Alexander's friends, Harpalus, Nearchus, Ptolemy and Erigyius, and had the Corinthians bring Thessalus to him in chains.

== King of Macedon ==
=== Accession ===
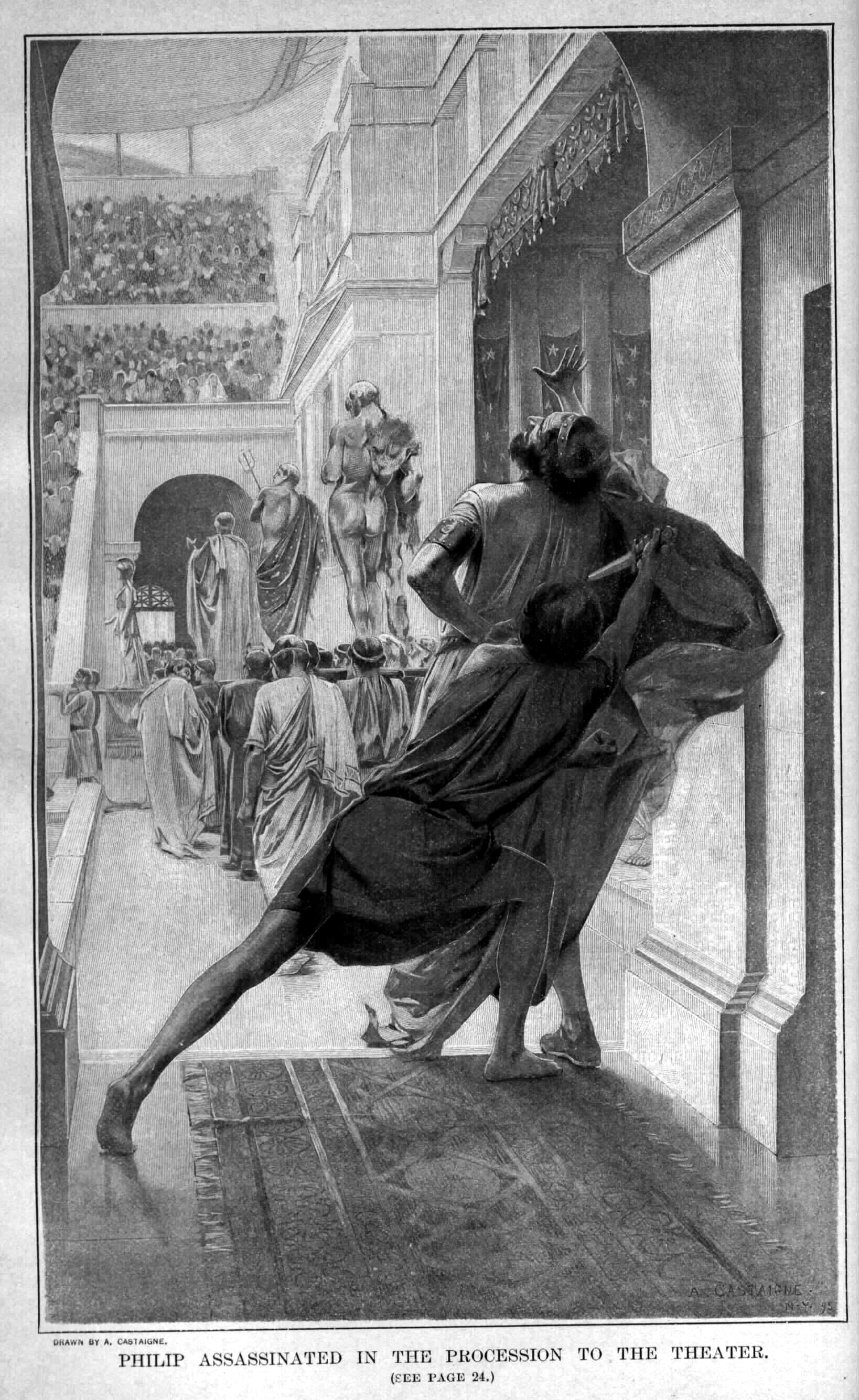
Pausanias assassinates Philip II, Alexander's father, during his procession into the theatre

On the 24th day of the Macedonian month Dios, which probably corresponds to 25 October 336 BC, while Philip attended his daughter Cleopatra's wedding to her uncle Alexander I of Epirus at Aigai (near modern Vergina), his chief bodyguard, Pausanias, assassinated him; (Note: There have been, since the time, many suspicions that Pausanias was actually hired to murder Philip. Suspicion has fallen upon his wife Olympias, his son Alexander, and the new Persian king Darius III. All three of these people had motive to have Philip murdered.) Diodorus claims Pausanias was also Philip's lover. As Pausanias tried to escape, he tripped over a vine and was killed by his pursuers, including two of Alexander's companions, Perdiccas and Leonnatus. The nobles and army proclaimed the 20-year-old Alexander king.

=== Consolidation of power ===
After his accession, Alexander eliminated potential rivals to the throne. He had his cousin, the former Amyntas IV, executed and two Macedonian princes from the region of Lyncestis killed for having been involved in his father's assassination, but spared a third, Alexander Lyncestes. Alexander was infuriated when his mother had his stepmother Cleopatra Eurydice and her daughter Europa burned alive, though he ordered the murder of Cleopatra's uncle Attalus, who was in command of the advance guard of the army in Asia Minor. Attalus was at that time corresponding with Demosthenes regarding the possibility of defecting to Athens, and had severely insulted Alexander. After his niece's murder, Alexander may have considered him too dangerous to be left alive. Alexander spared his half-brother Arrhidaeus.

News of Philip's death roused many states into revolt, including Thebes, Athens, Thessaly, and the Thracian tribes north of Macedon. When news of the revolts reached Alexander, he responded quickly. Though advised to use diplomacy, Alexander mustered 3,000 Macedonian cavalry and rode south towards Thessaly. He found the Thessalian army occupying the pass between Mount Olympus and Mount Ossa, and ordered his men to ride over Mount Ossa. When the Thessalians awoke the next day, they found Alexander in their rear and promptly surrendered, adding their cavalry to Alexander's force. He then continued south towards the Peloponnese.

Alexander stopped at Thermopylae where he was recognized as the leader of the Amphictyonic League before heading south to Corinth. Athens surrendered and Alexander pardoned the rebels. The famous encounter between Alexander and Diogenes the Cynic occurred during Alexander's stay in Corinth. When Alexander asked Diogenes what he could do for him, the philosopher disdainfully asked Alexander to stand a little to the side, as he was blocking the sunlight. This reply apparently delighted Alexander who is reported to have said, "But verily, if I were not Alexander, I would like to be Diogenes." At Corinth, Alexander took the title of Hegemon ("leader") and, like Philip, was appointed commander for the coming war against Persia. He also received news of a Thracian uprising.

=== Balkan campaign ===
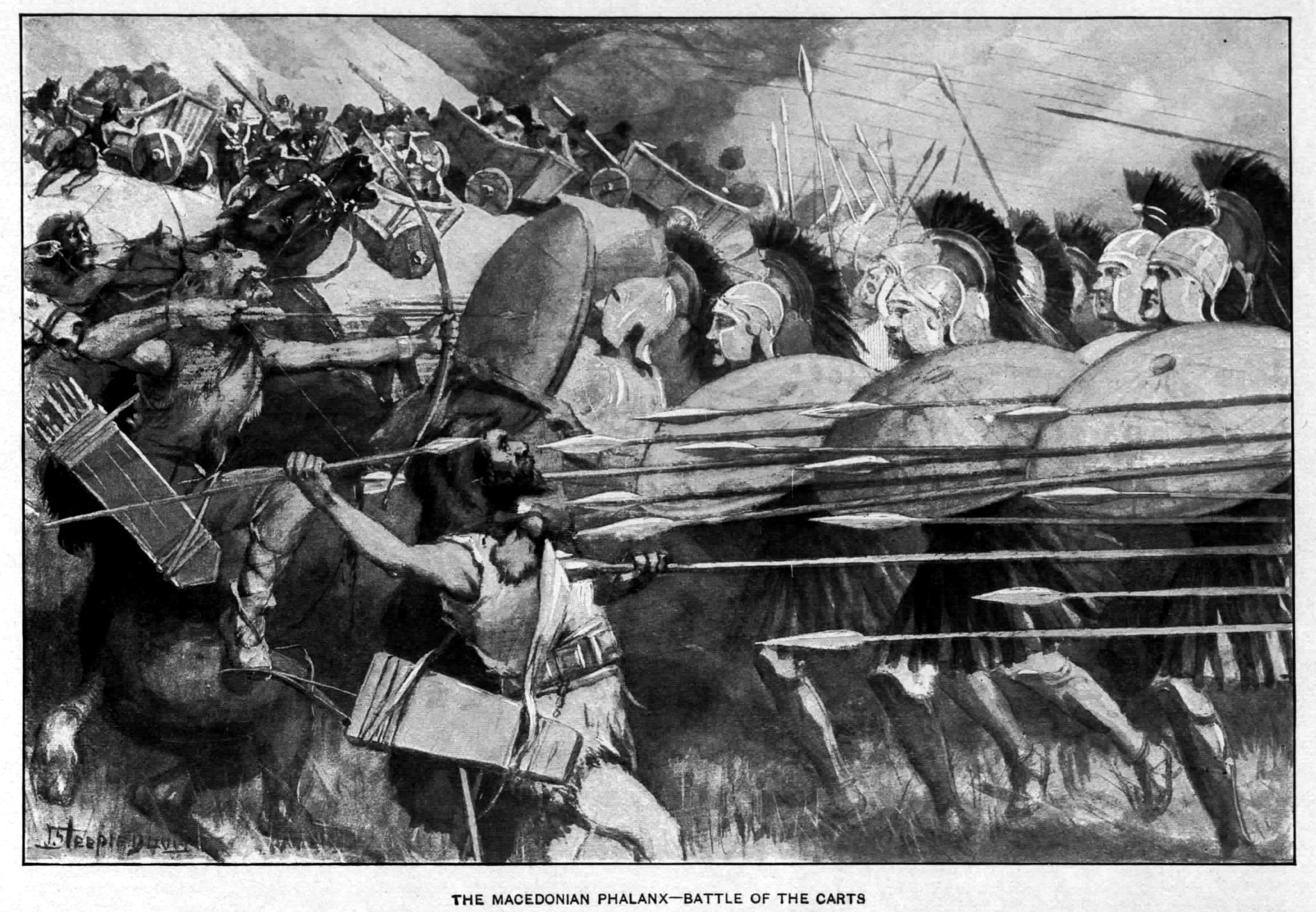
The Macedonian phalanx at the "Battle of the Carts" against the Thracians in 335 BC

Before crossing to Asia, Alexander wanted to safeguard his northern borders. In the spring of 335 BC, he advanced to suppress several revolts. Starting from Amphipolis, he travelled east under the "Independent Thracians", and at Mount Haemus, the Macedonian army attacked and defeated the Thracian forces manning the heights. The Macedonians marched into the country of the Triballi and defeated their army near the Lyginus river (a tributary of the Danube). Reaching the Danube after three days, Alexander encountered the Getae tribe on the opposite shore. Crossing the river at night, he surprised them and forced their army to retreat after the first cavalry skirmish.

News then reached Alexander that the Illyrian chieftain Cleitus and King Glaukias of the Taulantii were in open revolt against his authority. Marching west into Illyria, Alexander defeated each in turn, forcing the two rulers to flee with their troops. These victories secured his northern frontier.

=== Destruction of Thebes ===
While Alexander campaigned north, Thebes and Athens rebelled again. Alexander immediately headed south. While the other cities again hesitated, Thebes resisted. The Theban resistance was ineffective and Alexander razed the city and divided its territory between the other Boeotian cities. The end of Thebes cowed Athens, leaving all of Greece temporarily at peace. Alexander then left for Asia, leaving Antipater as regent.

== Conquest of the Persian Empire ==
=== Strategy ===
Alexander's invasion of Persia has been denoted as a supreme example of a "strategic line" of conducting war, a line formed by "the chain of logic that connects operations into a single whole." In his book Strategy, Soviet military officer and theorist Alexander Svechin delineates Alexander's strategic steps. After securing his Greek base and the Balkans by subjugating his political opponents, and securing his army's rear through the conquest of all the Afro-Asian coastline, where the Persian fleet was based and from which it was supplied, Alexander moved to confront directly the Persians. He thus resolved the eternal problem of an army conducting operations deep into enemy territory, Svechin states, in an "exemplary manner."

=== Asia Minor ===
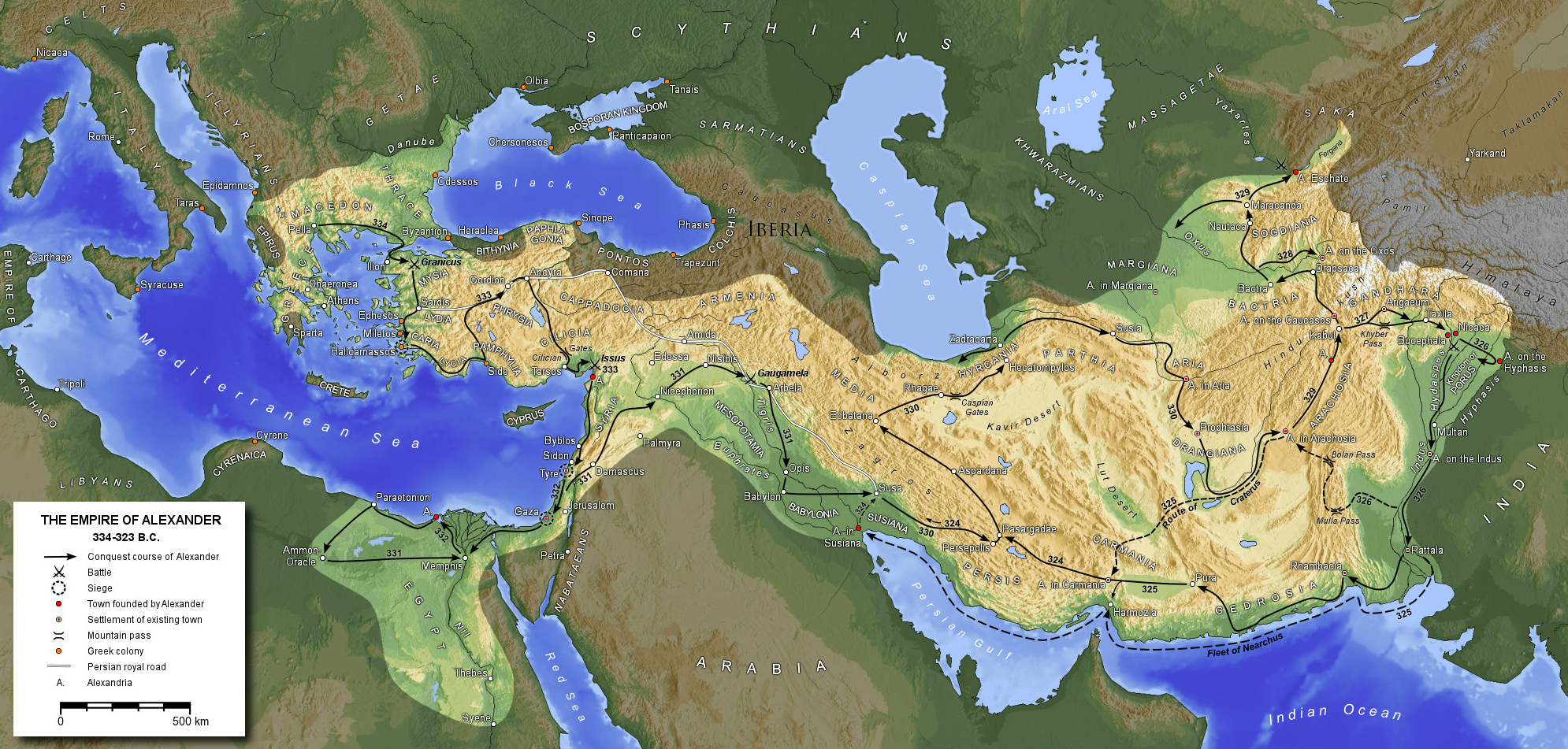
Map of Alexander's empire and his route

After his victory at the Battle of Chaeronea, Philip II established himself as hēgemṓn (Greek: ἡγεμών) of a league which according to Diodorus would campaign against the Persians for the many grievances Greece suffered in 480 BC and free the Greek cities of the western coast and islands from Achaemenid rule. In 336 he sent Parmenion, Amyntas, Andromenes, Attalus, and an army of 10,000 men into Anatolia to make preparations for an invasion. The Greek cities on the western coast of Anatolia revolted until news arrived of Philip's assassination and Alexander's accession. Philip's death demoralized the Macedonians, who then faced defeat near Magnesia by the Achaemenids under the command of the mercenary Memnon of Rhodes.

Continuing his father's invasion, Alexander crossed the Hellespont in 334 BC with approximately 48,100 soldiers, 6,100 cavalry, and 120 ships with crews numbering 38,000 drawn from Macedon and various Greek city states, mercenaries, and soldiers from Thrace, Paionia, and Illyria. (Note: However, Arrian, who used Ptolemy as a source, said that Alexander crossed with more than 5,000 horses and 30,000 footmen; Diodorus quoted the same totals, but listed 5,100 horses and 32,000 footmen. Diodorus also referred to an advance force already present in Asia, which Polyaenus, in his Stratagems of War (5.44.4), said numbered 10,000 men.) He showed his intent to conquer the Persian Empire by throwing a spear into Asian soil and declaring Asia a gift from the gods. This also showed Alexander's eagerness to fight, in contrast to his father's preference for diplomacy.

After an initial victory against Persian forces at the Battle of the Granicus, Alexander accepted the surrender of the Persian provincial capital and treasury of Sardis; he then proceeded along the Ionian coast, granting autonomy and democracy to the cities. Miletus, held by Achaemenid forces, required a delicate siege operation, with Persian naval forces nearby. Further south, at Halicarnassus, in Caria, Alexander successfully waged his first large-scale siege, eventually forcing his opponents, the mercenary captain Memnon of Rhodes and the Persian satrap of Caria, Orontobates, to withdraw by sea. He restored the government of Caria to Orontobates's predecessor, Ada, who adopted Alexander.

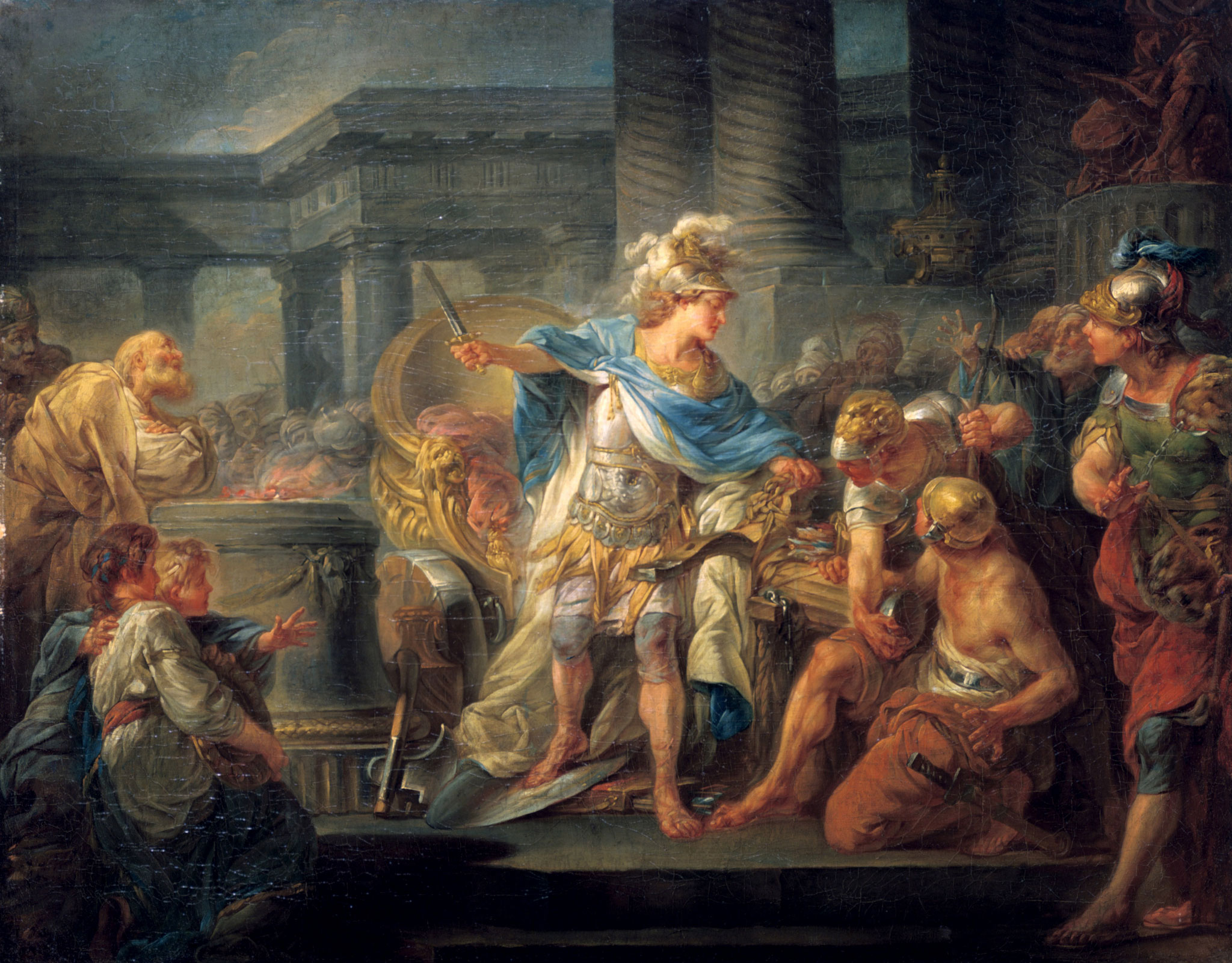
Alexander Cuts the Gordian Knot by Jean-Simon Berthélemy (1767)

From Halicarnassus, Alexander proceeded into mountainous Lycia and the Pamphylian plain, asserting control over all coastal cities to deny the Persians naval bases. From Pamphylia onwards, the coast held no major ports and Alexander moved inland. He did not storm the city of Termessos. At the ancient Phrygian capital of Gordium, Alexander "undid" the hitherto unsolvable Gordian Knot, a feat said to await the future "king of Asia". According to the story, Alexander proclaimed that it did not matter how the knot was undone, and cut it apart with his sword.

=== The Levant and Syria ===
In spring 333 BC, Alexander crossed the Taurus into Cilicia. After a long pause due to an illness, he marched on towards Syria. Though outmanoeuvered by the larger army of the Achaemenid king Darius III, he marched back to Cilicia, where he defeated Darius at Issus. Darius fled the battle, causing his army to collapse, and left behind his family and a fabulous treasure. He offered a peace treaty that included the lands he had lost, and a ransom of 10,000 talents for his family. Alexander replied that as king of Asia, he alone decided territorial divisions. Alexander proceeded to capture Syria and the Levantine coast. In the following year, 332 BC, he was forced to attack Tyre, which he captured after a long and difficult siege. The men of military age were massacred and the women and children sold into slavery.

=== Egypt ===
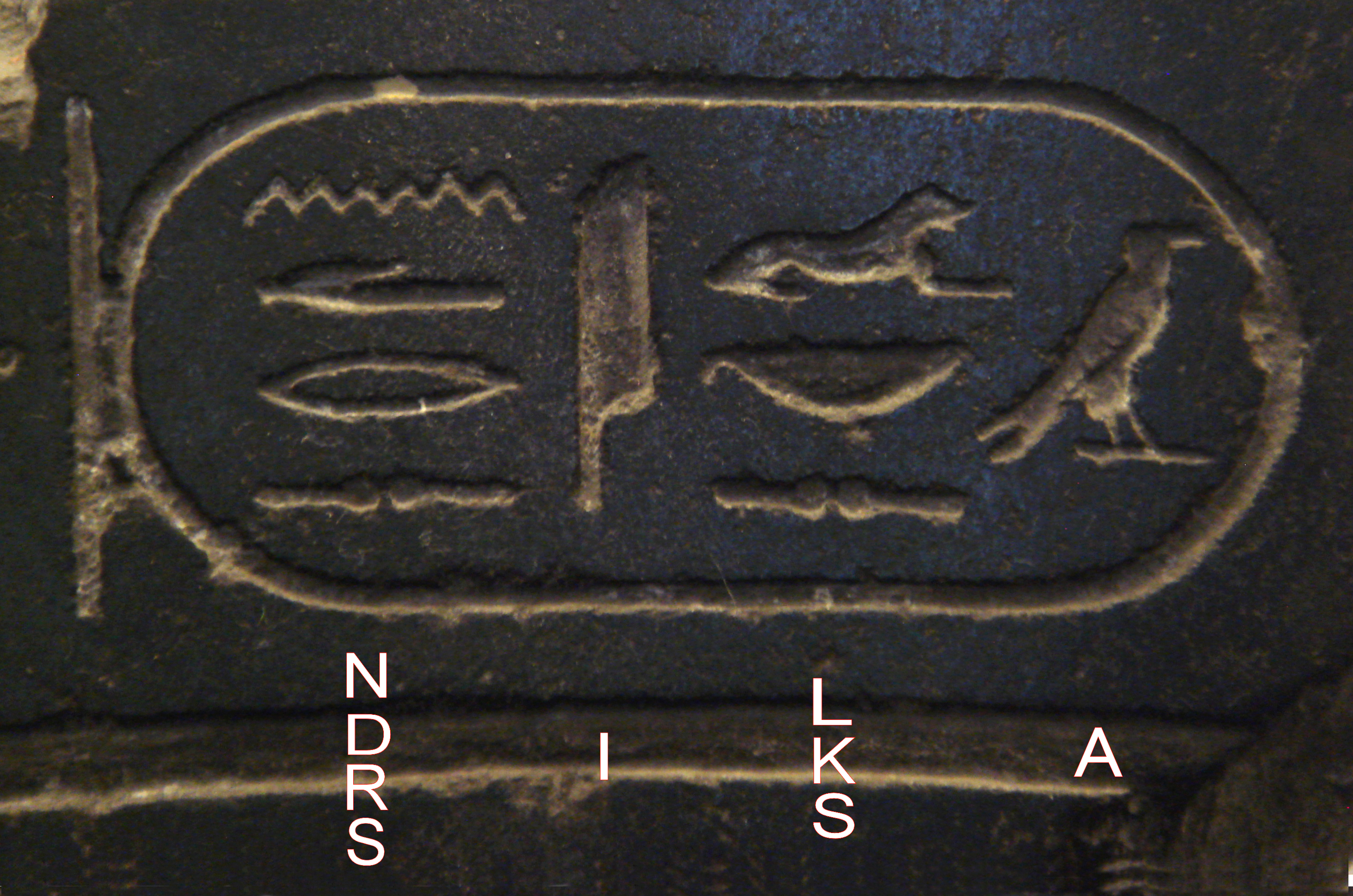
Name of Alexander in Egyptian hieroglyphs (written from right to left), c. 332 BC, Egypt. Louvre Museum.

When Alexander destroyed Tyre, most of the towns on the route to Egypt surrendered, but he faced resistance at Gaza. The stronghold was heavily fortified and built on a hill, requiring a siege. When "his engineers pointed out to him that because of the height of the mound it would be impossible... this encouraged Alexander all the more to make the attempt". After three unsuccessful assaults, the stronghold fell, but not before Alexander had received a serious shoulder wound. As in Tyre, the adult men were killed and the women and children enslaved.

Alexander advanced on Egypt in later 332 BC where he was regarded as a liberator. To legitimize taking power and be recognized as pharaoh, he sacrificed to the gods at Memphis and consulted the oracle of Amun-Ra at the Siwa Oasis in the Libyan desert, at which he was pronounced the son of the deity Amun. Henceforth, Alexander often referred to Zeus-Ammon as his true father, and after his death, currency depicted him adorned with horns, using the Horns of Ammon as a symbol of his divinity. The Greeks interpreted this message – one that the gods addressed to all pharaohs – as a prophecy.

Egypt was only one of many territories Alexander took from the Persians. After his trip to Siwa, Alexander was crowned in the temple of Ptah at Memphis. The Egyptian people apparently did not find it disturbing that he was a foreigner – nor that he was absent for virtually his entire reign. Alexander restored the temples neglected by the Persians and dedicated new monuments to the Egyptian gods. In the temple of Luxor, near Karnak, he built a chapel for the sacred barge. During his brief months in Egypt, he reformed the taxation system on the Greek models and organized the military occupation of the country, but in early 331 BC he left for Asia in pursuit of the Persians. In Egypt, Alexander founded Alexandria, which would become the prosperous capital of the Ptolemaic Kingdom. After his death, control of Egypt passed to his companion Ptolemy, who founded the Ptolemaic dynasty (305–30 BC).

=== Assyria and Babylonia ===
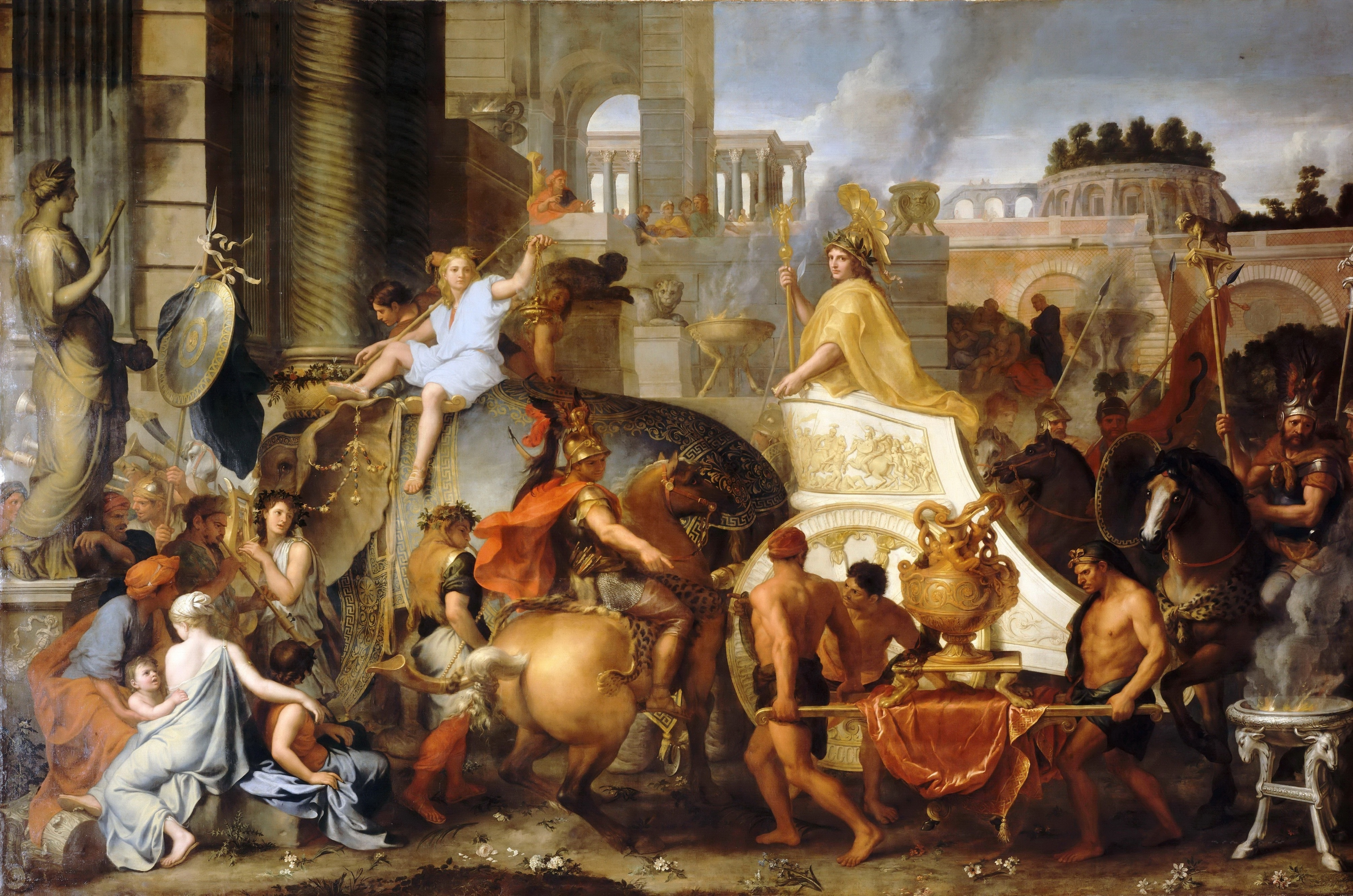
Entry of Alexander into Babylon by Charles Le Brun (1665)

Leaving Egypt in 331 BC, Alexander marched eastward into Achaemenid Assyria in Upper Mesopotamia (now northern Iraq) and defeated Darius III again at the Battle of Gaugamela. Darius once more fled the field, and Alexander followed him to Arbela. Gaugamela was their decisive final encounter. Darius fled to Ecbatana (modern Hamadan) while Alexander captured Babylon. Babylonian astronomical diaries say that King Alexander sent his scouts with a message to the people of Babylon before entering the city: "I shall not enter your houses".

=== Persia ===
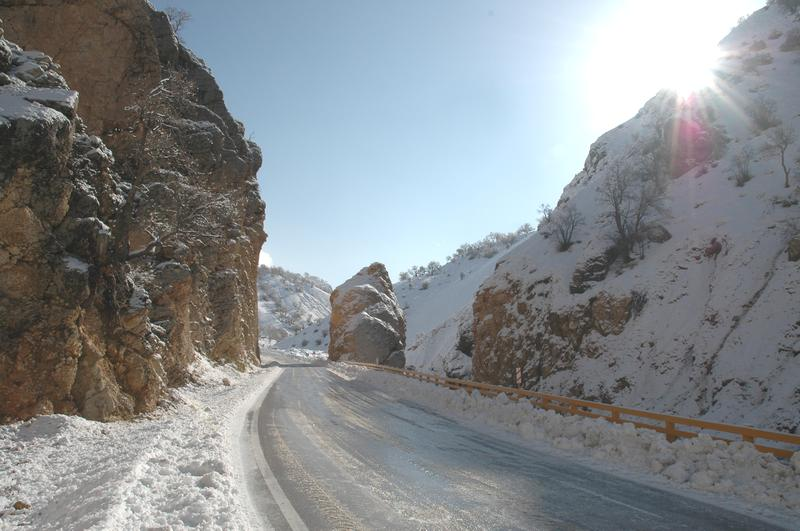
Site of the Persian Gate in modern-day Iran; the road was built in the 1990s.

Alexander then captured the treasury of Susa, one of the Achaemenid capitals. He sent the bulk of his army to the Persian ceremonial capital of Persepolis via the Persian Royal Road, taking a smaller force on the direct route. He then stormed the pass of the Persian Gates (in the modern Zagros Mountains) which had been blocked by a Persian army under Ariobarzanes and then hurried to Persepolis before its garrison could loot the treasury.

On entering Persepolis, Alexander allowed his troops to loot the city for several days. Alexander stayed in Persepolis for five months. During his stay, a fire broke out in the eastern palace of Xerxes I and spread to the rest of the city. Possible causes include a drunken accident or deliberate revenge for the burning of the Acropolis of Athens during the Second Persian War by Xerxes; Historians Plutarch and Diodorus allege that Alexander's companion, the hetaera Thaïs, started the fire. As the city burned, Alexander began to regret his decision. Plutarch claims that he ordered his men to put out the fires but the flames had already spread to most of the city. Curtius Rufus claims that Alexander did not regret his decision until the next morning. Plutarch recounts an anecdote in which Alexander pauses and talks to a fallen statue of Xerxes as if it were a live person:

Shall I pass by and leave you lying there because of the expeditions you led against Greece, or shall I set you up again because of your magnanimity and your virtues in other respects?

=== Fall of the Persian Empire and the East ===
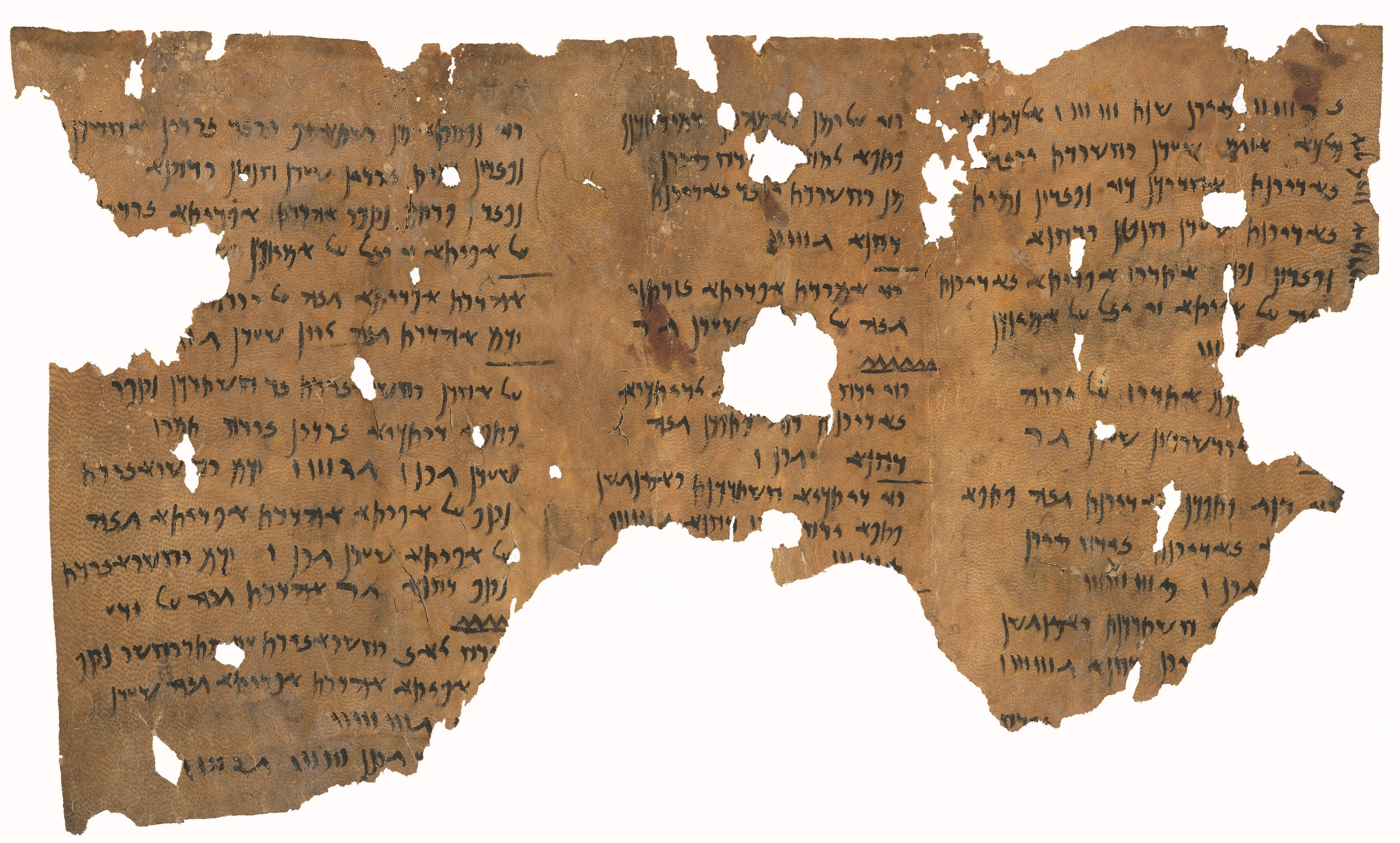
Administrative document from Bactria dated to the seventh year of Alexander's reign (324 BC), bearing the first known use of the "Alexandros" form of his name, Khalili Collection of Aramaic Documents

Alexander chased Darius, first into Media and then Parthia. Bessus, Darius's Bactrian satrap and kinsman, captured the now powerless king. As Alexander approached, Bessus had his fatally stab Darius and proclaimed himself King Artaxerxes V, before retreating into Central Asia to launch a guerrilla campaign against Alexander. Alexander buried Darius's remains next to his Achaemenid predecessors in a regal funeral. He claimed that the dying king had named him his successor. The Achaemenid Empire is normally considered to have fallen with Darius. However, as Alexander maintained and restored basic social and political structures, the Iranologist Pierre Briant considers him, in many respects, the last Achaemenid ruler.

Alexander viewed Bessus as an usurper and pursued him. The campaign against Bessus turned into a grand tour of central Asia. Alexander founded a series of new cities, all called Alexandria, including Alexandria Arachosia at modern Kandahar in Afghanistan, and Alexandria Eschate ("The Furthest") in modern Tajikistan. The campaign took Alexander through various satrapies in present-day Afghanistan and Central Asia, including Media, Parthia, Aria, Drangiana, Arachosia, Bactria, and Scythia.

In 329 BC, Bessus was executed after the Sogdian governor Spitamenes betrayed him to Alexander's trusted companion Ptolemy. Later, when Alexander faced a horse nomad army on the Jaxartes, Spitamenes raised Sogdiana in revolt. Alexander defeated the Scythians at the Battle of Jaxartes and then defeated Spitamenes at the Battle of Gabai. After the defeat, Spitamenes was killed by his own men, who then surrendered.

=== Problems and plots ===
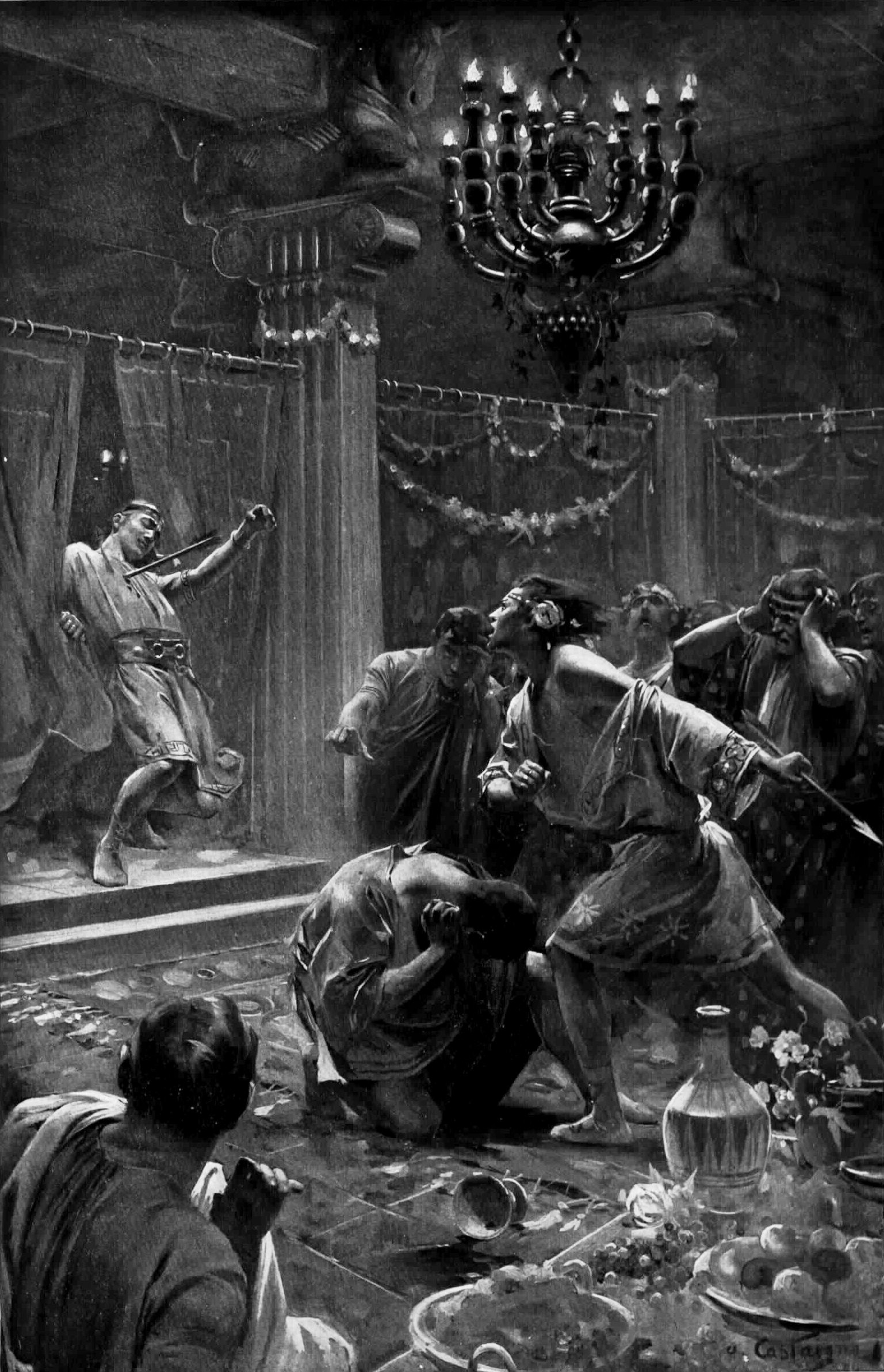
The Killing of Cleitus, by André Castaigne (1898–1899)

Alexander adopted elements of Persian dress and customs at his court, notably the custom of proskynesis, either a symbolic kissing of the hand, or prostration on the ground, that Persians showed to their social superiors. This was part of Alexander's strategy to secure Iranian aristocratic support. However, many Greeks opposed his demand for proskynesis, regarding it as reserved for deities and believing that he meant to deify himself. Alexander eventually abandoned this practice.

Under Achaemenid rule, the elite positions in many segments of the empire including the central government, the army, and the many satrapies were specifically reserved for Iranians and to a major degree, Persian noblemen. The latter were in many cases additionally connected through marriage alliances with the royal Achaemenid family. This created a problem for Alexander as to whether he had to make use of the various segments and people that had given the empire its solidity and unity for a lengthy period of time. Pierre Briant explains that Alexander realized that it was insufficient to merely exploit the internal contradictions within the imperial system as in Asia Minor, Babylonia or Egypt; he also had to (re)create a central government with or without the support of the Iranians. As early as 334 BC he demonstrated awareness of this, when he challenged Darius III "by appropriating the main elements of the Achaemenid monarchy's ideology, particularly the theme of the king who protects the lands and the peasants". Alexander wrote a letter in 332 BC to Darius III, wherein he argued that he was worthier than Darius to become the Persian king. However, Alexander's eventual decision to burn the Achaemenid palace at Persepolis and the Persian populace's rejection of him undermined his claim to be Darius's legitimate successor. Against Bessus however, Briant adds, Alexander reasserted "his claim to legitimacy as the avenger of Darius III".

A plot against Alexander's life was revealed, and his officer Philotas, son of the general Parmenion, was executed for failing to alert Alexander. The death of the son necessitated the death of the father, and Alexander ordered the assassination of Parmenion, whom he had charged with guarding the treasury at Ecbatana, to prevent attempts at vengeance. Most infamously, Alexander personally killed the man who had saved his life at Granicus, Cleitus the Black, during a drunken altercation at Maracanda (modern-day Samarkand in Uzbekistan), in which Cleitus accused Alexander of several judgmental mistakes and especially of having forgotten the Macedonian ways in favour of a corrupt oriental lifestyle.

Later, in the Central Asian campaign, a second plot against Alexander's life was revealed. This one was instigated by his own royal pages. His official historian, Callisthenes of Olynthus, was implicated in the plot, and in the Anabasis of Alexander, Arrian states that Callisthenes and the pages were then tortured on the rack as punishment, and likely died soon after. Callisthenes's involvement remains unclear, as he had already lost Alexander's favour by opposing the introduction of proskynesis.

=== Macedon in Alexander's absence ===
When Alexander set out for Asia, he left his general Antipater, an experienced military and political leader, and part of Philip II's "Old Guard", in charge of Macedon. Alexander's sacking of Thebes kept Greece subdued during his absence. The one exception was Spartan king Agis III's request for military aid in 331 BC; Antipater defeated and killed Agis at the Battle of Megalopolis. Antipater referred the Spartans' punishment to the League of Corinth, which then deferred to Alexander, who chose to pardon them. There was also considerable friction between Antipater and the queen-mother Olympias, and each complained to Alexander about the other.

In general, Greece enjoyed a period of peace and prosperity during Alexander's campaign in Asia. Alexander sent back vast sums from his conquest, which stimulated the economy and increased trade across his empire. However, Alexander's constant demands for troops and the migration of Macedonians throughout his empire depleted Macedon's strength, greatly weakening it in the years after Alexander, and ultimately led to its subjugation by Rome after the Third Macedonian War (171–168 BC).

=== Coinage ===
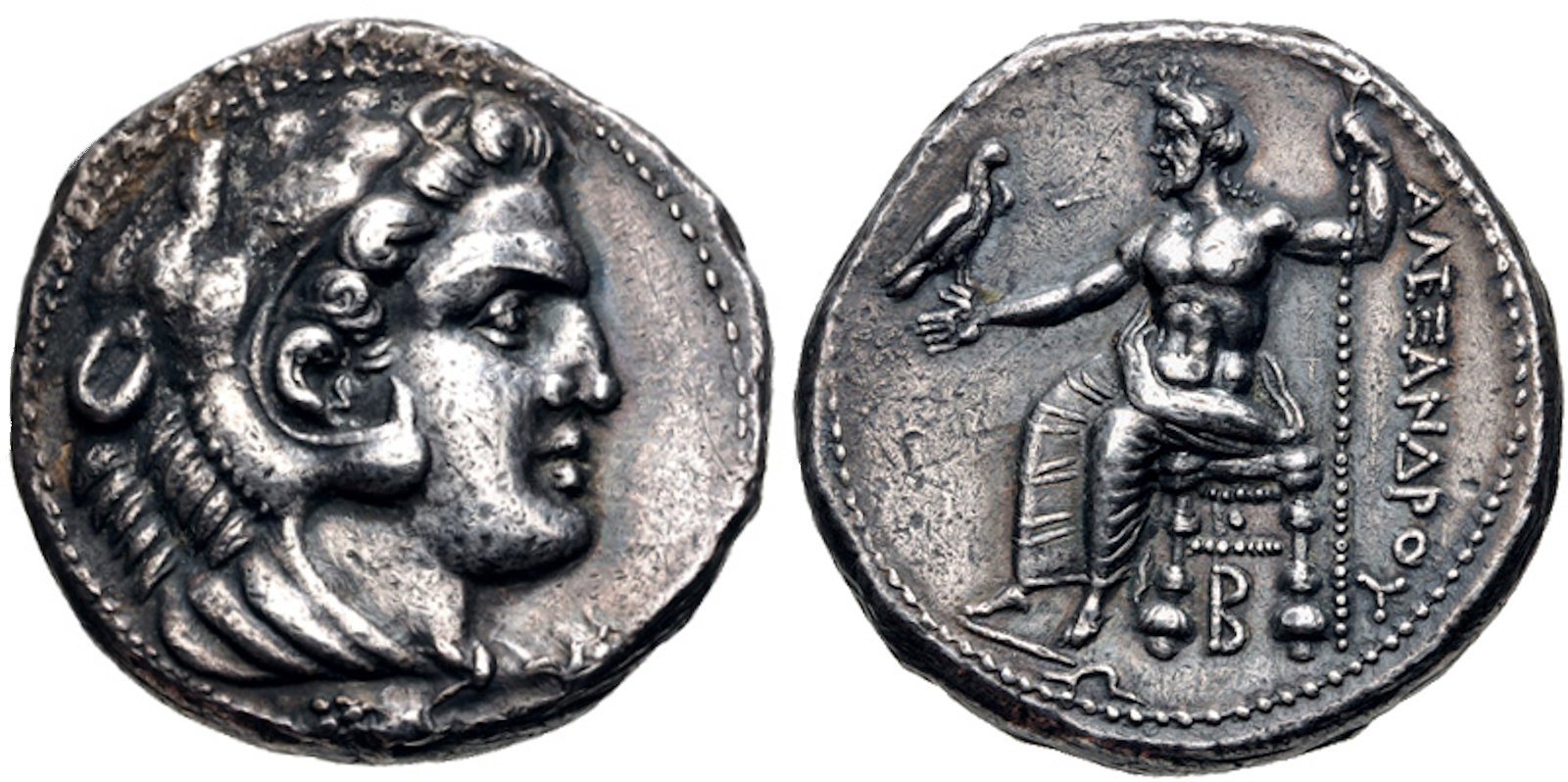
Silver tetradrachm of Alexander the Great struck by Balakros or his successor Menes, both former somatophylakes (bodyguards) of Alexander, when they held the position of satrap of Cilicia in the lifetime of Alexander, c. 333–327 BC. The obverse shows Heracles, ancestor of the Macedonian royal line and the reverse shows a seated Zeus Aëtophoros.

The conquest by Philip II of Pangaeum, and then of the island of Thasos between 356 and 342 BC brought rich gold and silver mines under Macedonian control. After the Battle of Issus in 333 BC, Alexander appears to have introduced a new coinage in Cilicia in Tarsus which became the empire's main coinage. He minted gold staters, silver tetradrachms and drachims, and various fractional bronze coins. The types of these coins remained constant in his empire. The gold series featured two goddesses, Athena on the obverse and Nike on the reverse. The silver coinage had a beardless Heracles wearing a lionskin headdress on the obverse and Zeus aetophoros ('eagle bearer') with a scepter in his left hand on the reverse. There are both Greek and non-Greek aspects to this design. Heracles and Zeus were important deities for the Macedonians, with Heracles considered to be the ancestor of the Temenid dynasty and Zeus the patron of the main Macedonian sanctuary, Dium. The lion was also the symbolic animal of the Anatolian god Sandas, worshipped at Tarsus. The reverse design of Alexander's tetradrachms is closely modelled on the depiction of the god Baaltars (Baal of Tarsus), on the silver staters minted at Tarsus by the Persian satrap Mazaeus before Alexander's conquest. Alexander did not impose uniform coinage across his empire. Persian coins continued to circulate in all the satrapies of the empire.

== Indian campaign ==
=== Forays into the Indian subcontinent ===
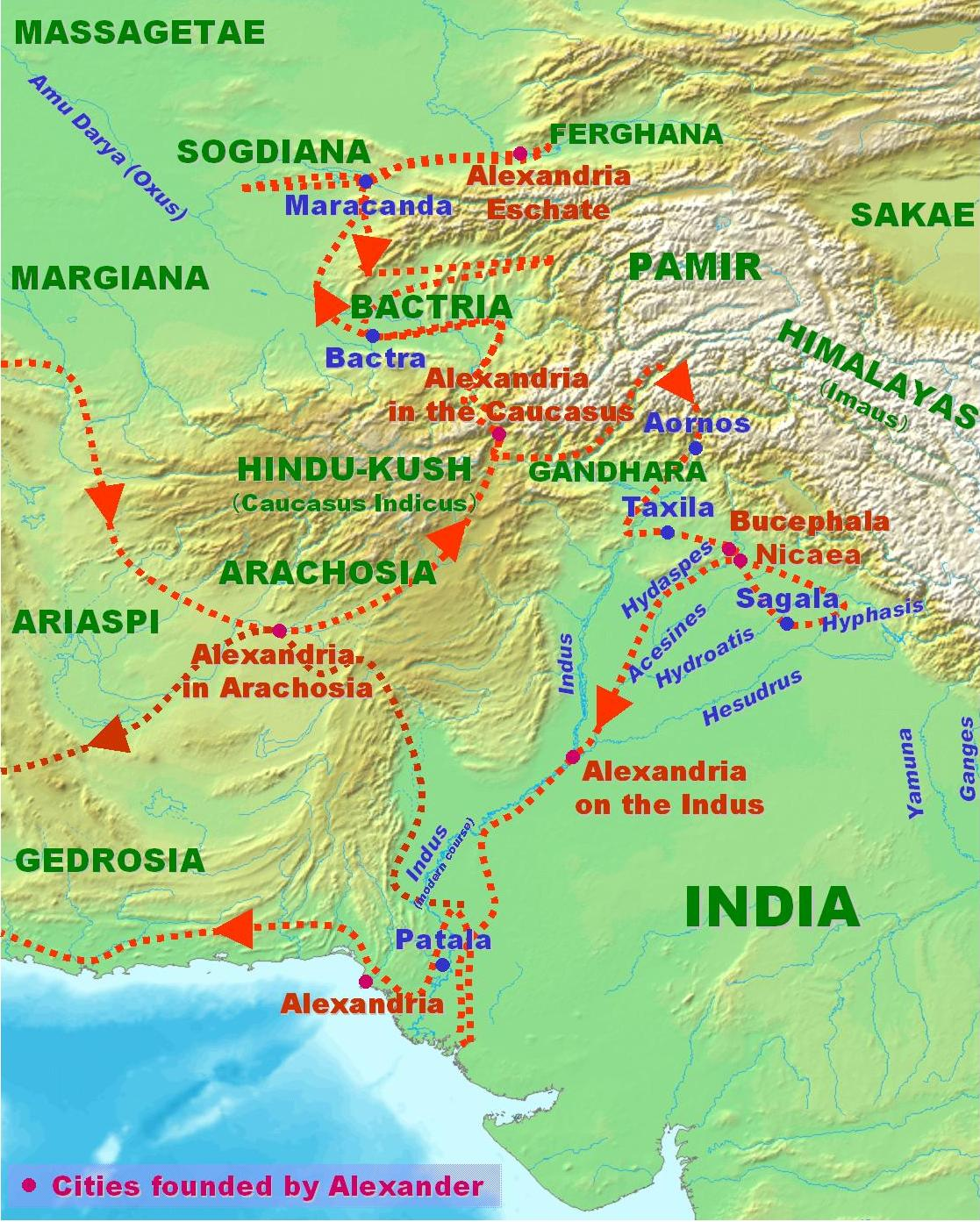
Alexander's invasion of the Indian subcontinent

After defeating the Sogdian rebel Spitamenes and marrying the Sogdian noblewoman Roxana, Alexander turned to the Indian subcontinent. He invited the chieftains of the former satrapy of Gandāra (in the present-day Peshawar Valley of Pakistan) to accept his authority. Omphis of Taxila, whose kingdom extended from the Indus to the Hydaspes (Jhelum), complied, but the chieftains of some hill clans, including the Aspasioi and Assakenoi, refused to submit. In the winter of 327/326 BC, Alexander personally led the Cophen campaign against the Aspasioi of the Kunar Valley, the Guraeans of the Panjkora Valley, and the Assakenoi of the Swat Valley. He won a fierce battle against the Aspasioi, though wounded in the shoulder by a dart, then faced the Assakenoi who fought against him from the strongholds of Massaga, Ora, and Aornos.

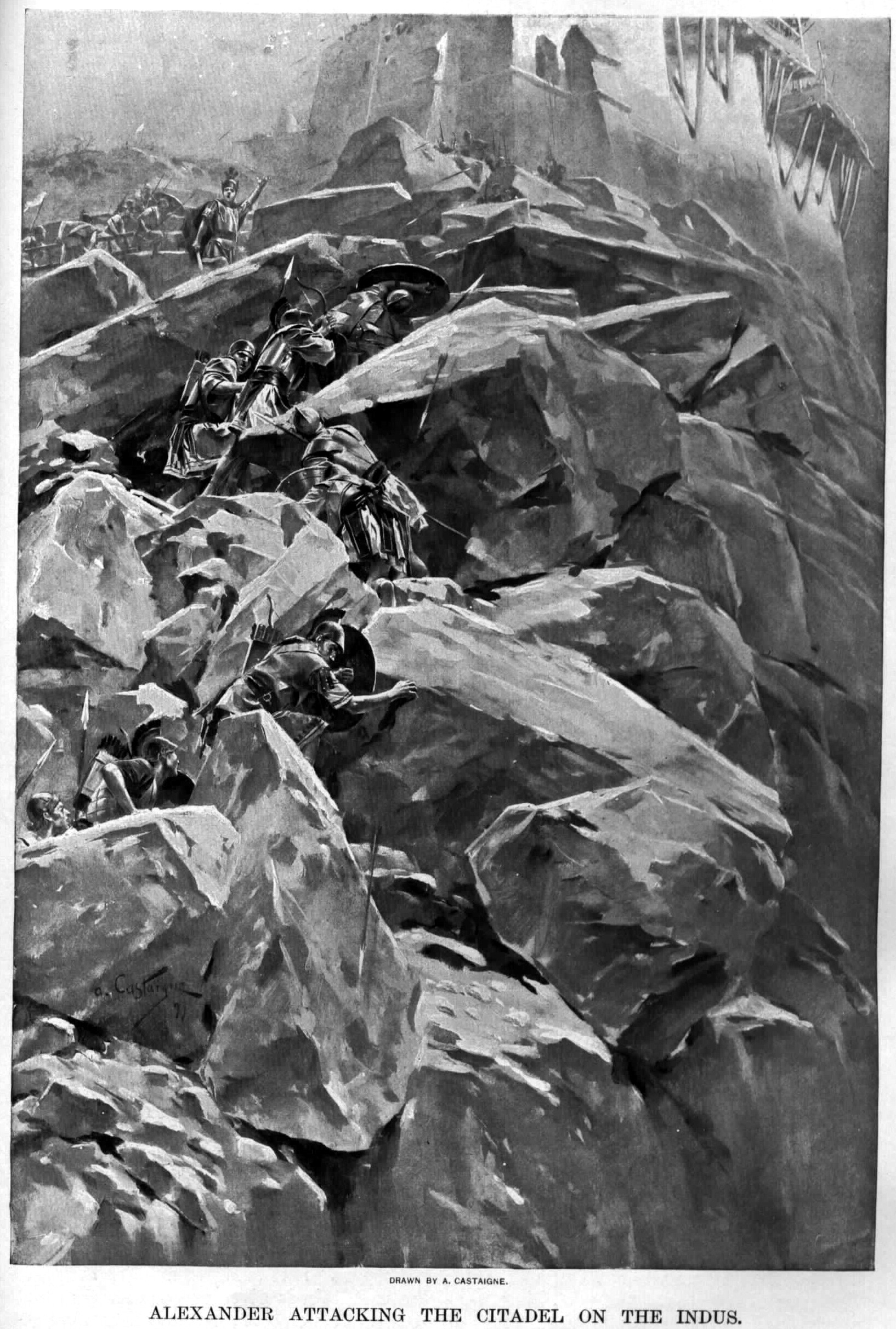
The Siege of Aornos by Andre Castaigne, painted 1899.

The fort of Massaga was reduced after days of bloody fighting in which Alexander was seriously wounded in the ankle. According to Curtius, "Not only did Alexander slaughter the entire population of Massaga, but also did he reduce its buildings to rubble." A similar massacre followed at Ora. Numerous Assakenians then fled to the fortress of Aornos. Alexander followed close behind and captured the strategic hill-fort after four days. After the Assakenoi leader died, his mother, Queen Cleophis, submitted to Alexander.

After Aornos, Alexander crossed the Indus. Omphis met him with valuable gifts, easing his worry, and offered Alexander his forces. Alexander not only returned Omphis his title and the gifts but also presented him with Persian robes, 30 horses, and 1,000 gold talents. Alexander was emboldened to divide his forces, and Omphis assisted Alexander's companions Hephaestion and Perdiccas in constructing a bridge over the Indus where it bends at Udabhanda, supplying their troops with provisions. At his capital Taxila, Omphis received Alexander and his army with great hospitality.

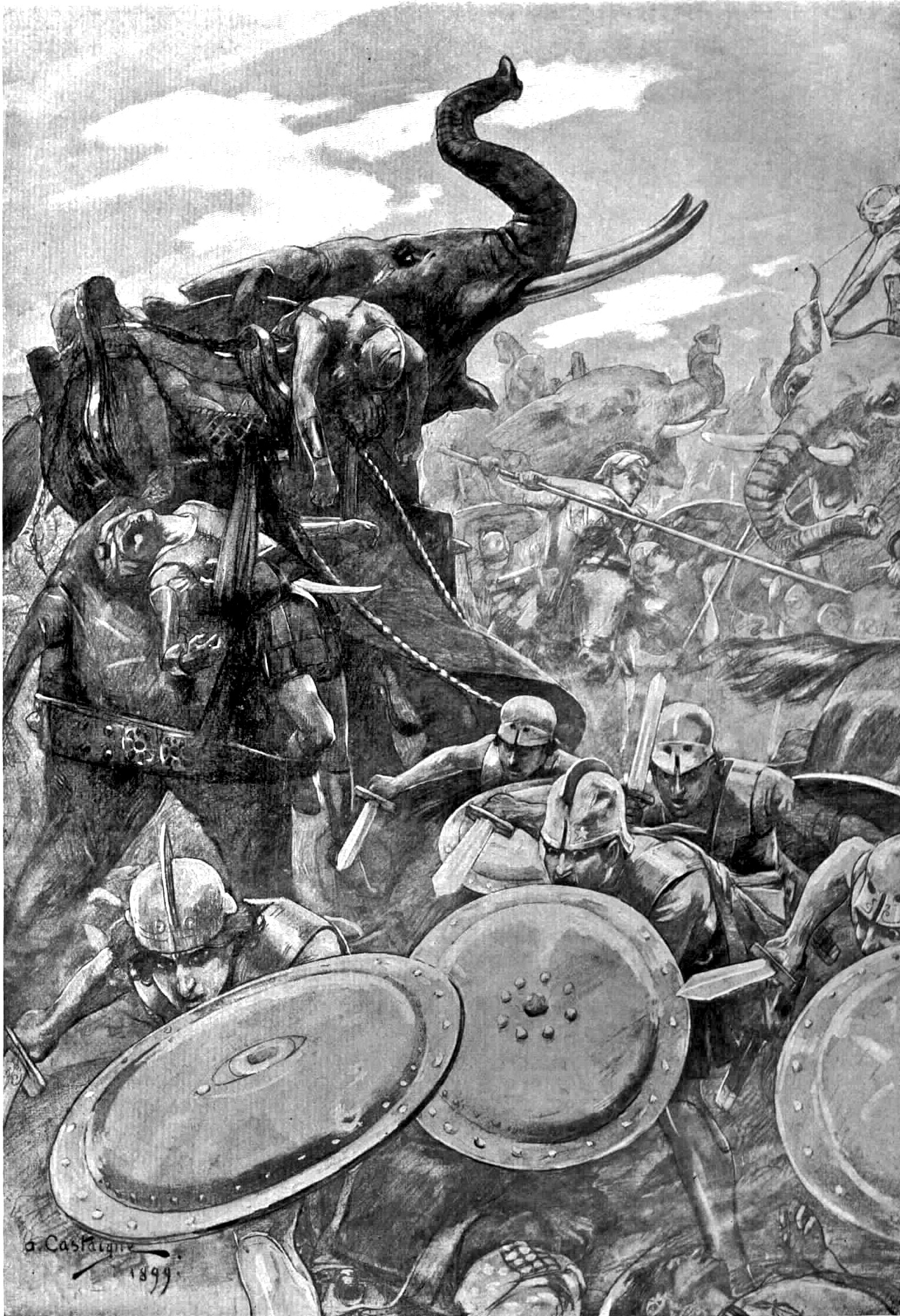
The Phalanx Attacking the Centre in the Battle of the Hydaspes by André Castaigne (1898–1899)

On Alexander's subsequent advance, Omphis accompanied him with a force of 5,000 men and took part in the Battle of the Hydaspes against King Porus, whose territory lay between the Hydaspes and the Acesines (Chenab) in the Punjab, in 326 BC. Alexander defeated Porus and sent Omphis in pursuit of him, charging him to offer favourable terms. Omphis almost died at the hands of his old enemy. Subsequently, Alexander reconciled the two rivals; Omphis heavily equipped the fleet on the Hydaspes, and Alexander entrusted him with the government of the whole territory between that river and the Indus. Alexander was also impressed by Porus's bravery, made him an ally, appointed him as satrap, and enlarged his territory. Choosing local rulers helped Alexander maintain his empire. A considerable accession of power was granted to Porus after the death of Philip, son of Machatas, and he was allowed to retain his authority even after Alexander died in 323 BC.

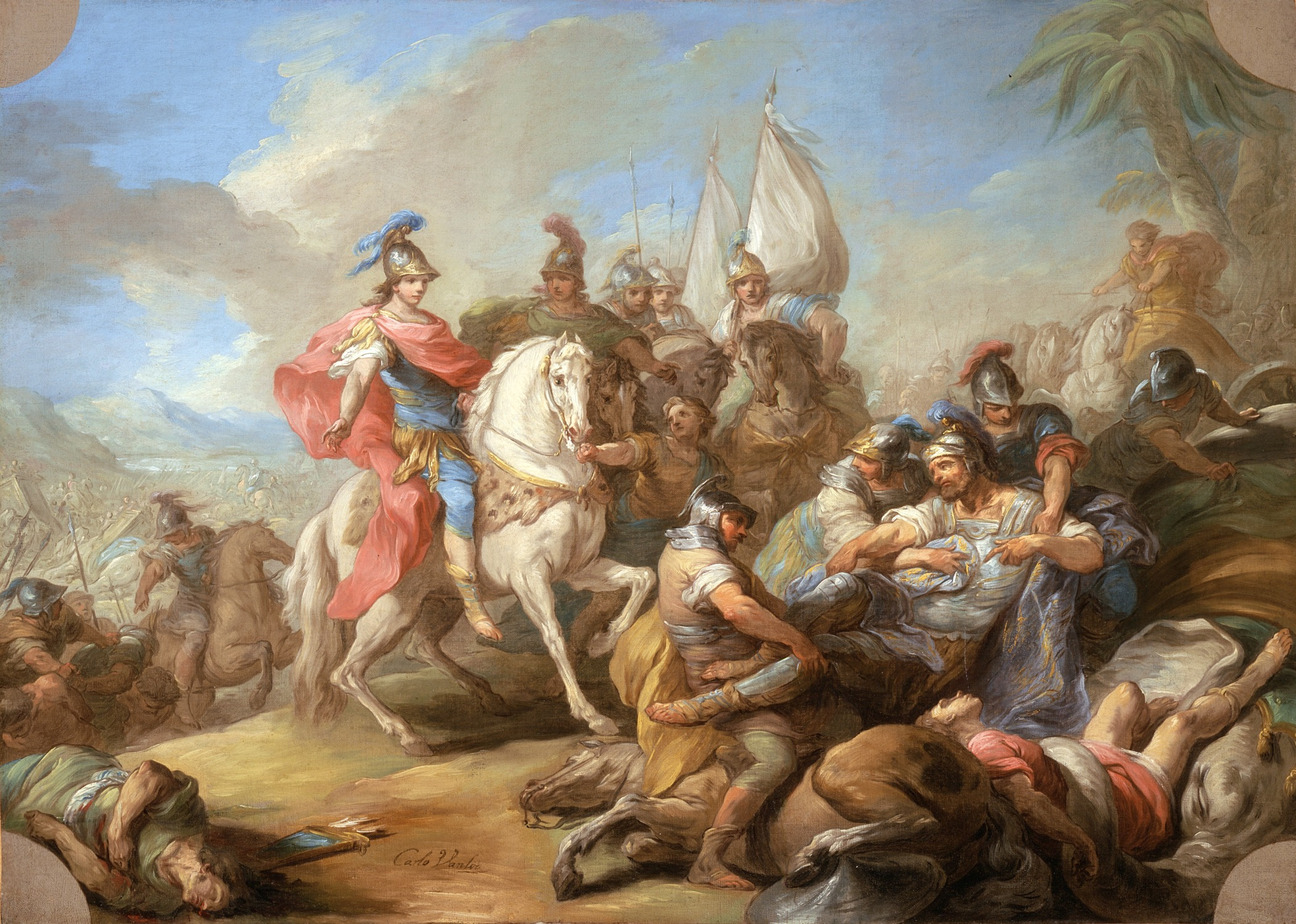
The Victory of Alexander over Porus by Charles-André van Loo (1705–1765).

Alexander founded two cities on opposite sides of the Hydaspes river, naming one Bucephala, in honour of his horse, who died around this time. The other was Nicaea (Victory), believed to be located at the site of modern-day Mong. In the Life of Apollonius of Tyana, Philostratus the Elder mentions an elephant in Porus's army who fought bravely against Alexander's army; Alexander dedicated it to the Helios (Sun) and named it Ajax because he thought that such a great animal deserved a great name. Its tusks bore gold rings with a Greek inscription: "Alexander the son of Zeus dedicates Ajax to the Helios" (ΑΛΕΞΑΝΔΡΟΣ Ο ΔΙΟΣ ΤΟΝ ΑΙΑΝΤΑ ΤΩΙ ΗΛΙΩΙ).

=== Revolt of the Hellenic army ===
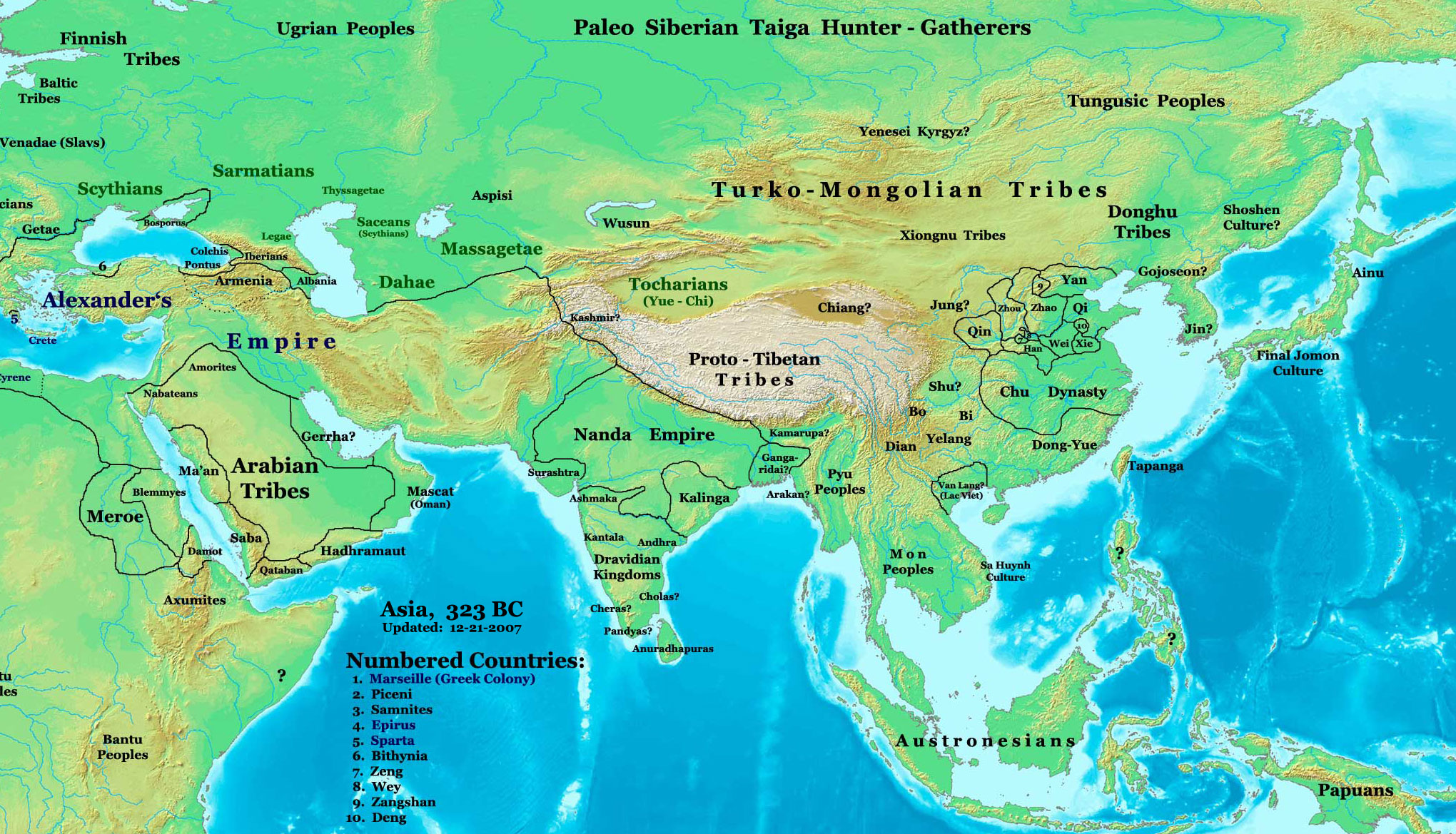
Asia in 323 BC: the Nanda Empire and the Gangaridai of the Indian subcontinent in relation to Alexander's empire and neighbours

East of Porus's kingdom, near the Ganges River, was the Nanda Empire of Magadha, and further east, the Gangaridai Empire of the Bengal region. Fearing the prospect of facing other large armies and exhausted by years of campaigning, Alexander's army mutinied at the Hyphasis River (Beas), refusing to march farther east. Plutarch states that Alexander and his troops faced 20,000 men when fighting Porus's army, while the eastward kingdoms had upward of 280,000 soldiers. The Hyphasis River thus marks the easternmost extent of Alexander's conquests.

Alexander tried to persuade his soldiers to march farther, but his general Coenus pleaded with him to return, saying the men missed their families and homeland. Alexander eventually agreed and turned south, marching along the Indus. Along the way his army campaigned against the Mallians and conquered their territory; while besieging the Mallian citadel, Alexander suffered a near-fatal injury when an arrow penetrated his armor and entered his lung.

Alexander sent much of his army to Carmania (modern southern Iran) with general Craterus, and commissioned a fleet to explore the Persian Gulf shore under his admiral Nearchus, while he led the rest back to Persia through the more difficult southern route along the Gedrosian Desert and Makran. Alexander reached Susa in 324 BC, but not before losing many men to the harsh desert.

== Last years in Persia ==
Discovering that many of his satraps and military governors had misbehaved in his absence, Alexander executed several of them as examples on his way to Susa. As a gesture of thanks, he paid off his soldiers' debts, and announced he would send aged and disabled veterans back to Macedon, led by Craterus. His troops misunderstood his intention and mutinied at the town of Opis. They refused to be sent away and criticized his adoption of Persian customs and dress and the introduction of Persian officers and soldiers into Macedonian units.

After three days, unable to persuade his men to back down, Alexander gave Persians command posts in the army and conferred Macedonian military titles upon Persian units. The Macedonians quickly begged forgiveness, which Alexander accepted, and held a great banquet with several thousand of his men. In an attempt to craft a lasting harmony between his Macedonian and Persian subjects, Alexander oversaw the weddings at Susa of his senior officers to Persian and other noblewomen, but few of those marriages seem to have lasted much beyond a year.

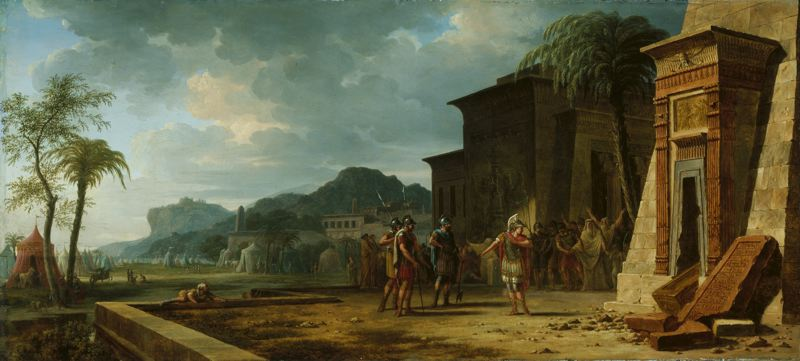
Alexander at the Tomb of Cyrus the Great, by Pierre-Henri de Valenciennes (1796)

Meanwhile, upon his return to Persia, Alexander learned that guards of the tomb of Cyrus the Great in Pasargadae had desecrated it, and swiftly executed them. He admired Cyrus the Great, reading about him from an early age in Xenophon's Cyropaedia. During his visit to Pasargadae, Alexander ordered his architect Aristobulus to decorate the interior of the sepulchral chamber of Cyrus's tomb.

Afterwards, Alexander travelled to Ecbatana to retrieve the bulk of the Persian treasure. There, his closest friend, Hephaestion, died of illness or poisoning. Hephaestion's death devastated Alexander and he ordered the preparation of an expensive funeral pyre in Babylon along with a decree for public mourning. Back in Babylon, Alexander planned a series of new campaigns, beginning with an invasion of Arabia.

== Death and succession ==
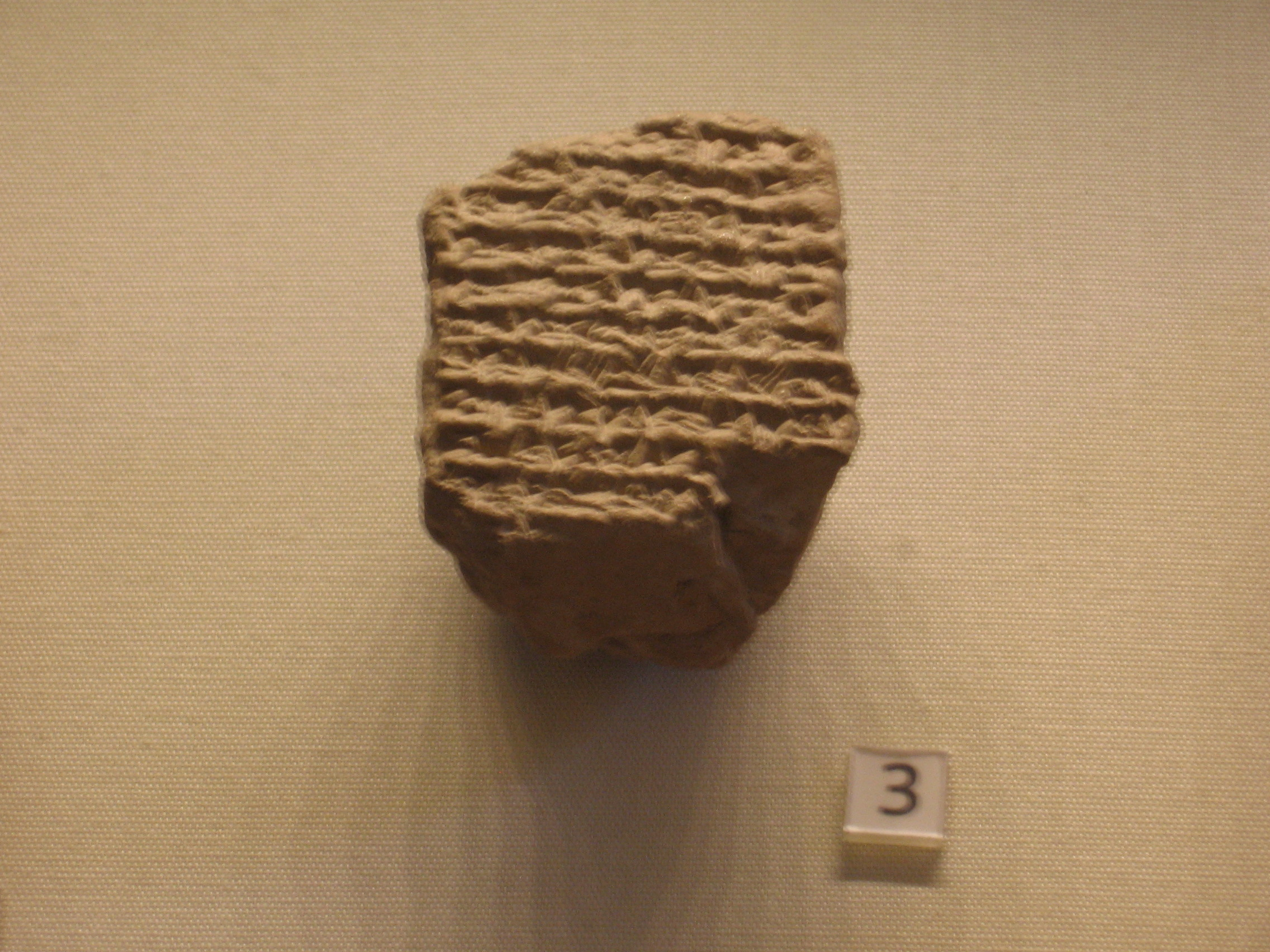
A Babylonian astronomical diary (c. 323–322 BC) recording the death of Alexander (British Museum, London)

On either 10 or 11 June 323 BC, Alexander died in the palace of Nebuchadnezzar II, in Babylon, at age 32. There are two versions of Alexander's death, differing slightly in details. Plutarch states that roughly 14 days before his death, Alexander entertained admiral Nearchus and spent the night and next day drinking with Medius of Larissa. Alexander developed a fever, which worsened until he was unable to speak. The common soldiers, anxious about his health, were granted the right to file past him as he silently waved at them. In the second account, Diodorus recounts that Alexander was struck with pain after downing a large bowl of unmixed wine in honour of Heracles followed by 11 days of weakness; he did not develop a fever, instead dying after some agony. Arrian also mentioned this as an alternative, but Plutarch denied this claim.

Given the Macedonian aristocracy's propensity to assassination and Alexander's relatively young age, foul play featured in multiple accounts of his death. Diodorus, Plutarch, Arrian and Justin all mentioned the theory that Alexander was poisoned. Justin stated that Alexander was the victim of a poisoning conspiracy, Plutarch dismissed it as a fabrication, while both Diodorus and Arrian noted that they mentioned it only for completeness. The accounts were nevertheless fairly consistent in designating the general Antipater, recently replaced as Macedonian viceroy by Craterus, as the head of the alleged plot. Perhaps fearing Alexander would execute him and having seen the fate of the general Parmenion and his son Philotas, Antipater purpotedly had his son Iollas, who was Alexander's wine-pourer, poison the King. Aristotle was also implicated. The strongest argument against the poison theory is the fact that twelve days passed between the start of his illness and his death; such long-acting poisons were probably not available.

However, in a 2003 BBC documentary investigating Alexander's death, Leo Schep from the New Zealand National Poisons Centre proposed that the plant white hellebore (Veratrum album), known in antiquity, may have been used to poison Alexander. In a 2014 paper in the journal Clinical Toxicology, Schep suggested Alexander's wine was spiked with Veratrum album, and that this would produce poisoning symptoms that match the course of events described in the Alexander Romance. Veratrum album poisoning can have a prolonged course and may offer the most plausible cause. Another explanation put forward in 2010 proposed that the circumstances of his death were compatible with poisoning by water of the river Styx (modern-day Mavroneri in Arcadia, Greece) that contained calicheamicin, a dangerous compound produced by bacteria.

Several natural causes (diseases) have been suggested, including malaria and typhoid fever. A 1998 article in the New England Journal of Medicine attributed Alexander's death to typhoid fever complicated by bowel perforation and ascending paralysis. A 2004 analysis suggested pyogenic (infectious) spondylitis or meningitis. Other illnesses fit the symptoms, including acute pancreatitis, West Nile virus, and Guillain-Barré syndrome. Natural-cause theories also tend to emphasize that Alexander's health may have declined after years of heavy drinking and severe wounds. Anguish over his friend Hephaestion's death may also have contributed to his declining health.

=== Post-death events ===
Alexander's body was laid in a gold anthropoid sarcophagus that was filled with honey, which was in turn placed in a gold casket. According to the historian Aelian, a seer called Aristander foretold that the land where Alexander was buried "would be happy and unvanquishable forever". Perhaps more likely, his successors, the Diadochi, may have seen possession of the body as a symbol of legitimacy, since burying the prior king was a royal prerogative.

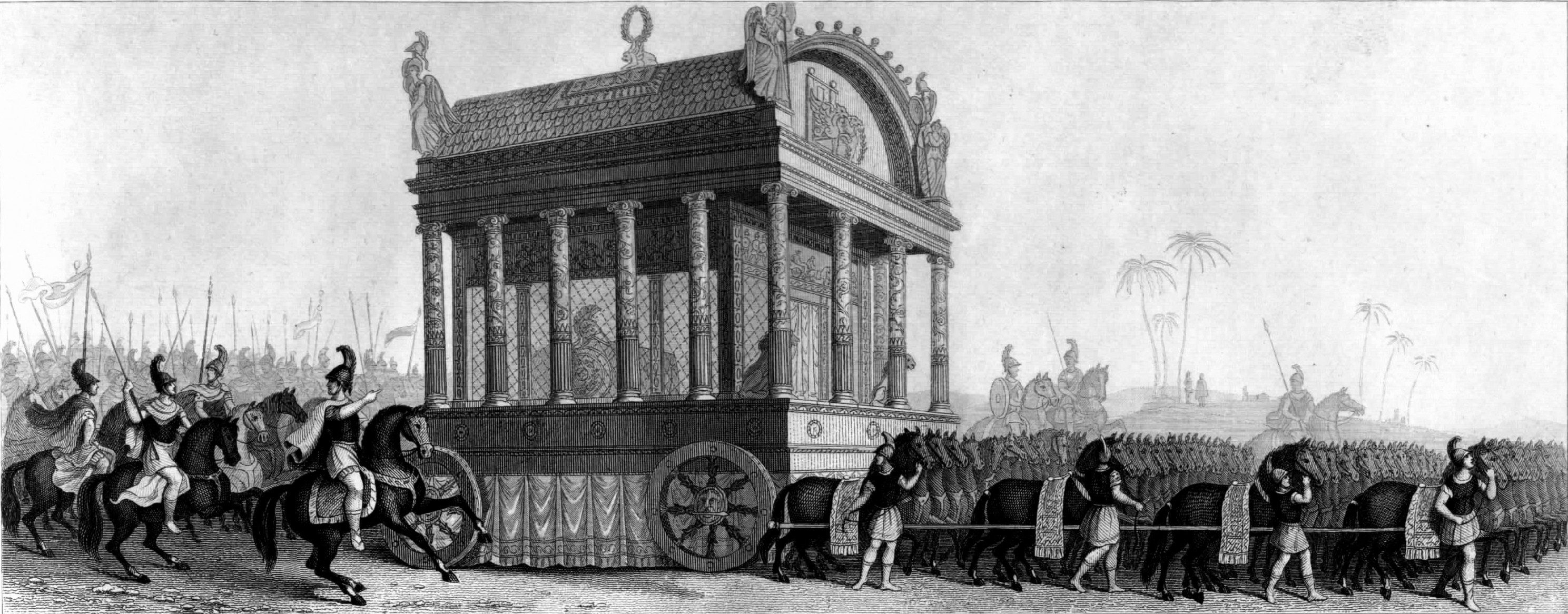
19th-century depiction of Alexander's funeral procession, based on the description by Diodorus Siculus

While Alexander's funeral cortege was on its way to Macedon, his companion Ptolemy seized it and took it temporarily to Memphis. His successor, Ptolemy II Philadelphus, transferred the sarcophagus to Alexandria, where it remained until at least late antiquity. Ptolemy's descendant Ptolemy IX Lathyros replaced Alexander's sarcophagus with a glass one so he could convert the original to coinage. The 2014 discovery of an enormous tomb in northern Greece, at Amphipolis, dating from the time of Alexander the Great has brought speculation that it was originally intended to be his burial place. This would fit with the intended destination of his funeral cortege. However, the memorial was found to be dedicated to his closest friend, Hephaestion.

Roman leaders Pompey, Julius Caesar, and Augustus all visited the tomb in Alexandria where Augustus, allegedly, accidentally knocked off the nose of Alexander's mummified body. Emperor Caligula reportedly took Alexander's breastplate from the tomb for his own use. Around AD 200, Emperor Septimius Severus closed Alexander's tomb to the public. His son and successor, Caracalla, a great admirer, visited the tomb during his reign. After this, its fate is unclear.

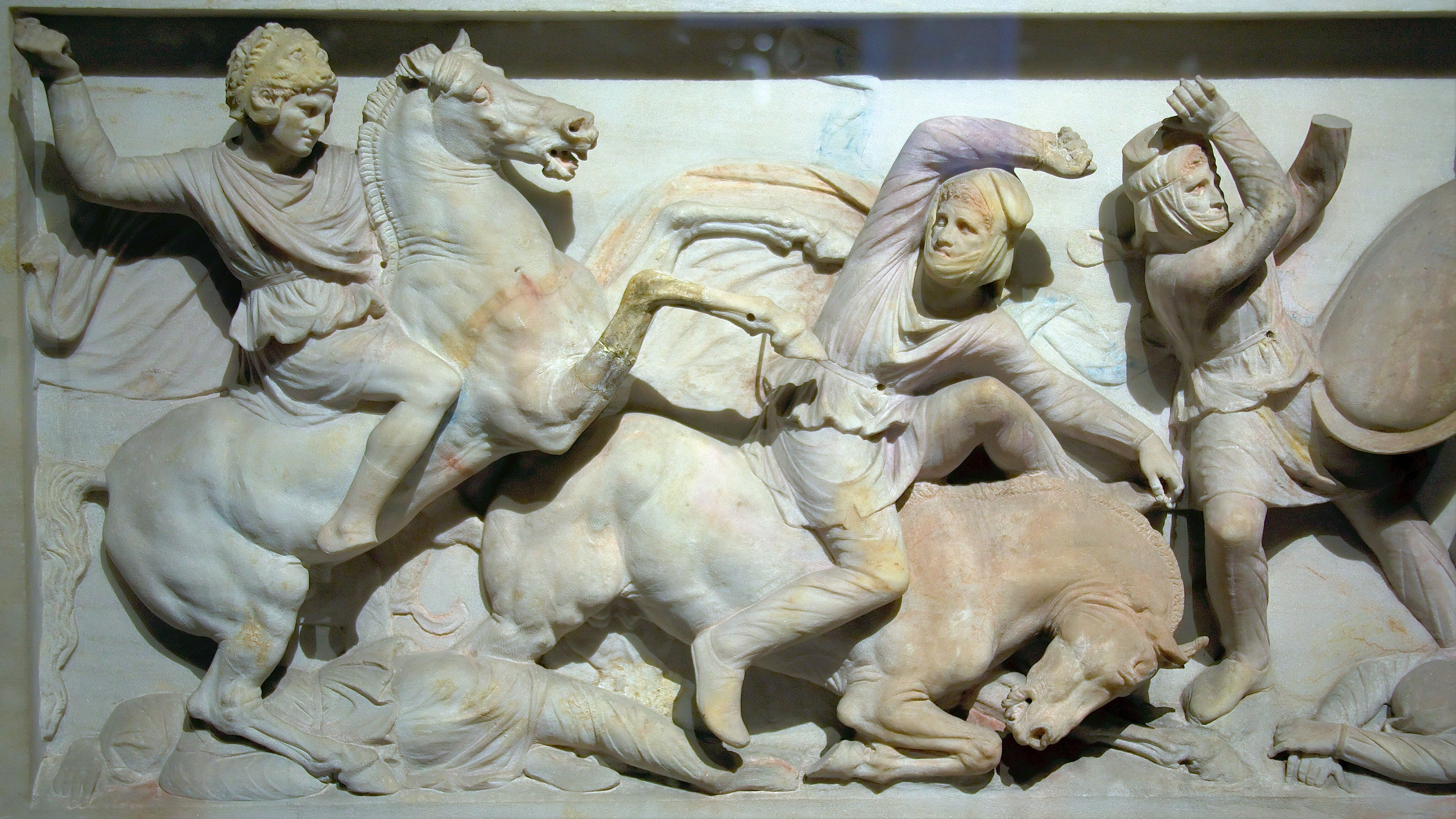
Detail of Alexander on the Alexander Sarcophagus

The so-called "Alexander Sarcophagus", discovered near Sidon and now in the Istanbul Archaeology Museum, is so named not because it was thought to have contained Alexander's remains, but because its bas-reliefs depict Alexander and his companions fighting the Persians and hunting. It was originally thought to have been the sarcophagus of Abdalonymus (died 311 BC), whom Alexander appointed king of Sidon after the Battle of Issus in 332. However, in 1969, Karl Schefold suggested that it may date from earlier than Abdalonymus's death.

Demades likened the Macedonian army after Alexander's death to the blinded Cyclops due to the many random and disorderly movements that it made. In addition, Leosthenes also likened the anarchy between the generals to the blinded Cyclops "who after he had lost his eye went feeling and groping about with his hands before him, not knowing where to lay them".

=== Division of the Macedonian Empire ===
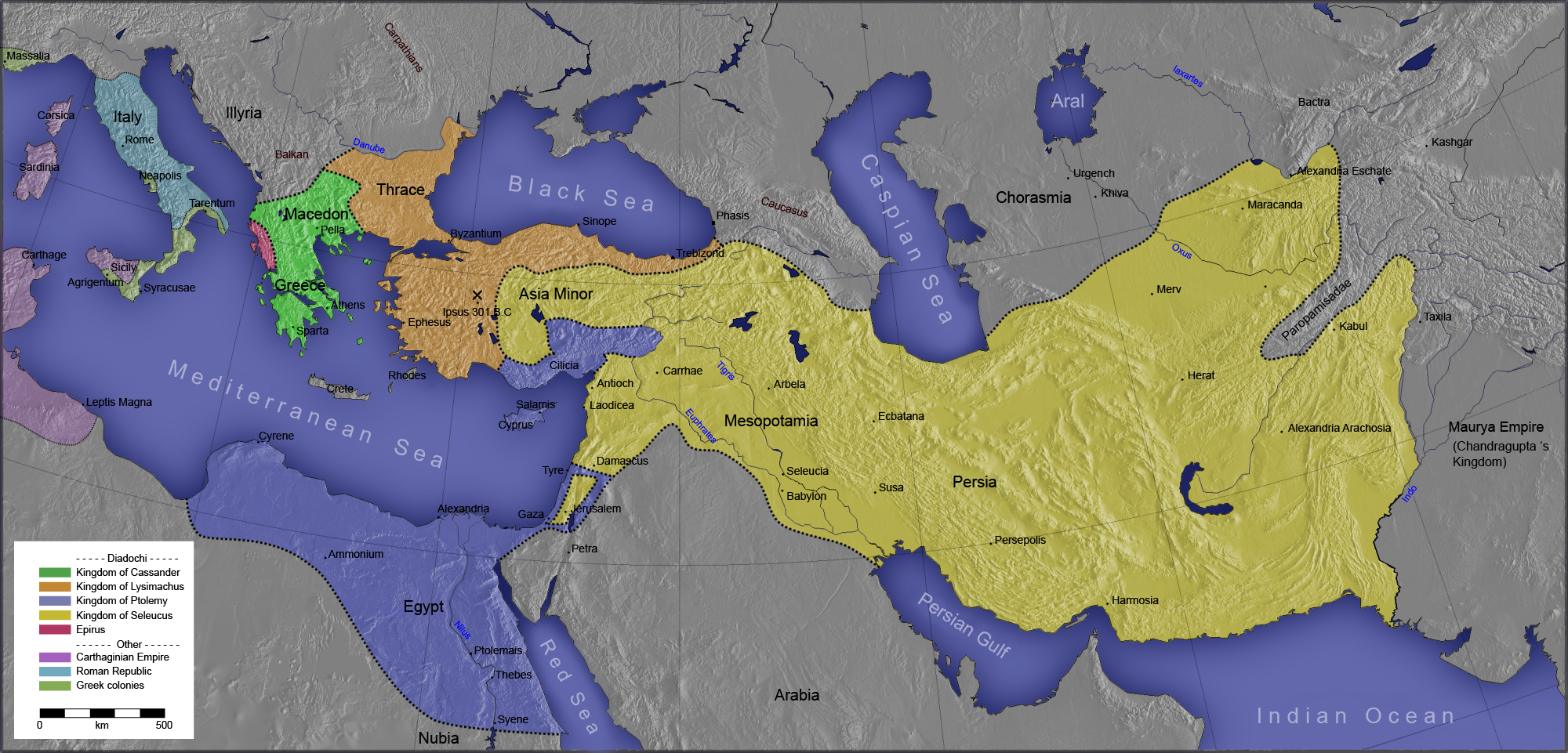
Kingdoms of the Diadochi in 301 BC: the Ptolemaic Kingdom (dark blue), the Seleucid Empire (yellow), Kingdom of Lysimachus (orange), and Kingdom of Macedon (green). Also shown are the Roman Republic (light blue), the Carthaginian Republic (purple), and the Kingdom of Epirus (red).

Alexander's death was so sudden that when reports of his death reached Greece, they were not immediately believed. Alexander had no obvious or legitimate heir, his son Alexander IV by Roxane being born posthumously. According to Diodorus, Alexander's companions asked him on his deathbed to whom he bequeathed his kingdom; his laconic reply was "tôi kratistôi"—"to the strongest". Another theory is that his successors wilfully or erroneously misheard "tôi Kraterôi"—"to Craterus", the general leading his Macedonian troops home and newly entrusted with the regency of Macedonia. Historians Arrian and Plutarch claimed that Alexander was speechless by this time, implying that this story was apocryphal. Diodorus, Curtius, and Justin offered the more plausible story that Alexander passed his signet ring to Perdiccas, a bodyguard and leader of the companion cavalry, in front of witnesses, thereby nominating him.

Perdiccas initially did not claim power, instead suggesting that Roxane's baby would be king, if male, with himself, Craterus, Leonnatus, and Antipater as guardians. However, the infantry under Meleager rejected this arrangement since they had been excluded from the discussion. Instead, they supported Alexander's half-brother Arrhidaeus. Eventually, the two sides reconciled, and after Alexander IV was born, he and Arrhidaeus were nominally appointed joint kings. Dissension and rivalry soon affected the Macedonians. The satrapies Perdiccas handed out at the Partition of Babylon became power bases for rival generals. After Perdiccas's assassination in 321 BC, Macedonian unity collapsed, and 40 years of war between the Diadochi ensued before the Hellenistic world settled into three stable power blocs: Ptolemaic Egypt, Seleucid Syria and Persia, and Antigonid Macedonia. In the process, both Alexander IV and Arrhidaeus were murdered.

=== Last plans ===
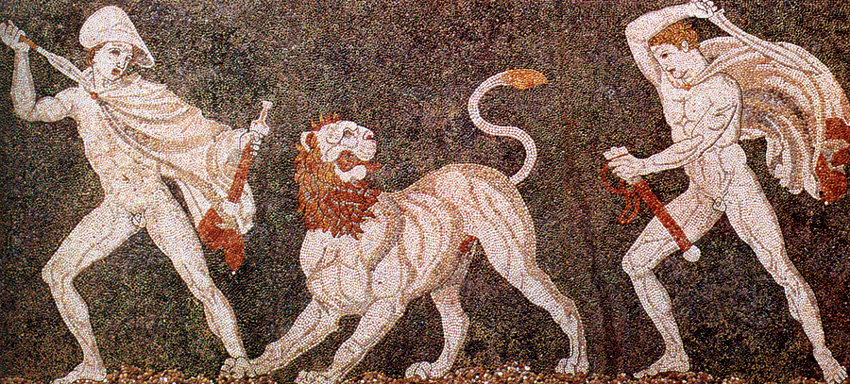
Alexander (left), wearing a kausia and fighting an Asiatic lion with his friend Craterus (detail); late 4th century BC mosaic, Pella Museum

Diodorus stated that Alexander had given detailed written instructions to Craterus some time before his death, which are known as Alexander's "last plans". Craterus started to carry out Alexander's commands, but the successors chose not to further implement thembecause they were impractical and extravagant. Perdiccas also read the notebooks containing Alexander's last plans to the Macedonian troops in Babylon, who voted against their implementation.

According to Diodorus, Alexander's last plans called for military expansion into the southern and western Mediterranean, monumental constructions, and the intermixing of Eastern and Western populations. It included:

- Construction of 1,000 ships larger than triremes, along with harbours and a road running along the African coast all the way to the Pillars of Hercules, to be used for an invasion of Carthage and the western Mediterranean;
- Erection of great temples in Delos, Delphi, Dodona, Dium, Amphipolis, all costing 1,500 talents, and a monumental temple to Athena at Troy
- Amalgamation of small settlements into larger cities ("synoecisms") and the "transplant of populations from Asia to Europe and in the opposite direction from Europe to Asia, in order to bring the largest continent to common unity and to friendship by means of intermarriage and family ties"
- Construction of a monumental tomb for his father Philip, "to match the greatest of the pyramids of Egypt"
- While not mentioned by Diodorus, the later historian Arrian mentioned that Alexander had planned to conquer Arabia
- Circumnavigation of Africa

The enormous scale of these plans has led many scholars to doubt their historicity. Ernst Badian argued that Perdiccas exaggerated them in order to ensure that the Macedonian troops voted not to carry them out. Other scholars have proposed that they were invented by later authors within the tradition of the Alexander Romance.

== Character ==
=== Generalship ===
Alexander perhaps earned the epithet "the Great" due to his unparalleled success as a military commander; he never lost a battle, despite typically being outnumbered. This was due to use of terrain, phalanx and cavalry tactics, bold strategy, and the fierce loyalty of his troops. Through rigorous training, Philip II had developed and perfected the Macedonian phalanx, armed with the sarissa, a spear 6 metres (20 ft) long, and Alexander used the phalanx's speed and manoeuvrability to great effect against larger but more disparate Persian forces. Alexander also recognized the potential for disunity among his diverse army, which employed various languages and weapons. He overcame this by being personally involved in battle, in the manner of a Macedonian king.

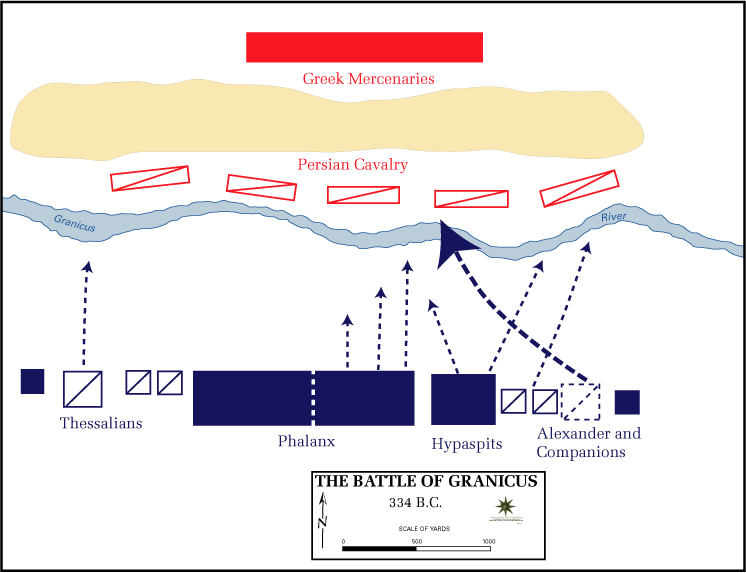
The Battle of the Granicus, 334 BC

In his first battle in Asia, at Granicus, Alexander used only a small part of his forces, perhaps 13,000 infantry with 5,000 cavalry, against a much larger Persian force of 40,000. He placed the phalanx at the center and cavalry and archers on the wings, so that his line matched the length of the Persian cavalry line, about 3 km (1.86 mi). By contrast, the Persian infantry was stationed behind its cavalry. This ensured that Alexander would not be outflanked, while his phalanx, armed with long pikes, had a considerable advantage over the Persians' scimitars and javelins. Macedonian losses were negligible compared to those of the Persians.

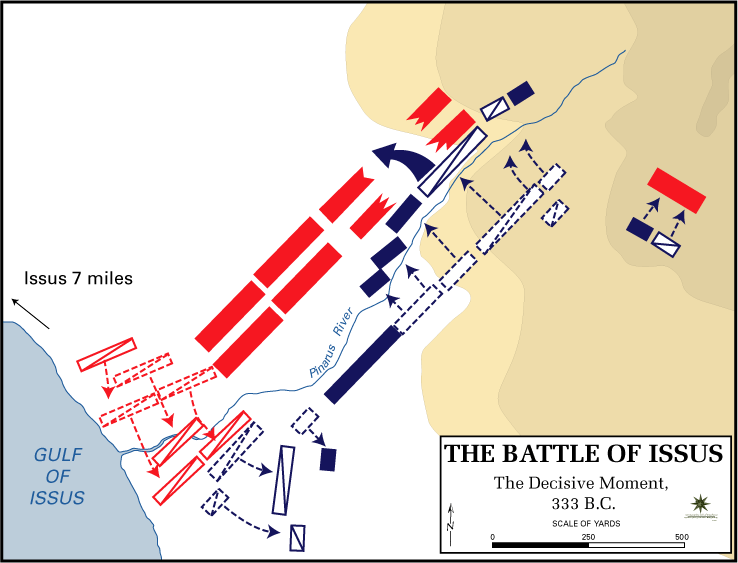
The Battle of Issus, 333 BC

At Issus in 333 BC, his first confrontation with Darius, Alexander used the same deployment, and again the central phalanx pushed through. Alexander personally led the charge in the center, routing the opposing army. At the decisive encounter with Darius at Gaugamela, Darius equipped his chariots with scythes on the wheels to break up the phalanx and equipped his cavalry with pikes. Alexander arranged a double phalanx, with the center advancing at an angle, parting when the chariots bore down and then reforming. The advance broke Darius's center, causing him to flee again.

When faced with opponents who used unfamiliar fighting techniques, such as in Central Asia and India, Alexander adapted his forces to his opponents' style. Thus, in Bactria and Sogdiana, he successfully used his javelin throwers and archers to prevent outflanking movements, while massing his cavalry at the center. In India, confronted by Porus's elephant corps, the Macedonians opened their ranks to envelop the elephants and used their sarissas to strike upwards and dislodge the elephants' handlers.

=== Physical appearance ===
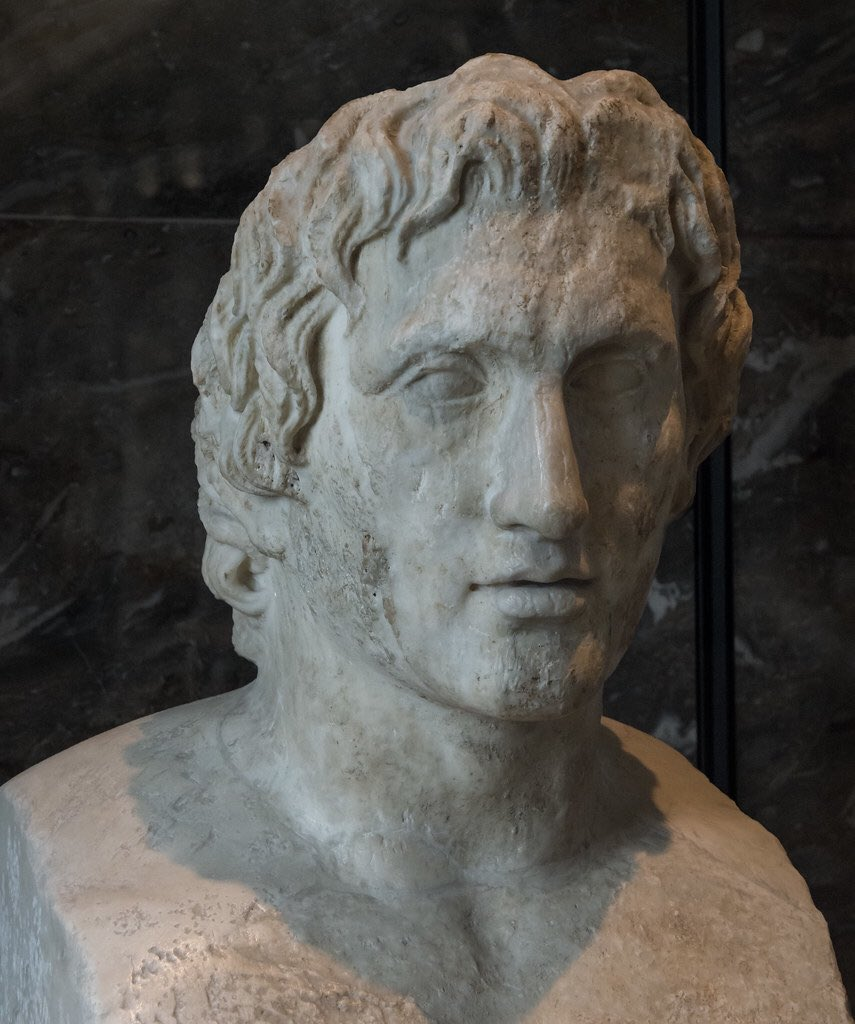
Roman copy of the Alexander portrait by Lysippos

Historical sources frequently give conflicting accounts of Alexander's appearance, and the earliest sources provide the least detail; for example, Arrian describes him simply as "very handsome". During his lifetime, Alexander carefully curated his image by commissioning works from famous artists. This included commissioning sculptures by Lysippos, paintings by Apelles and gem engravings by Pyrgoteles. Ancient authors recorded that Alexander was so pleased with portraits of himself created by Lysippos that he forbade other sculptors from crafting his image; scholars today, however, find the claim dubious. Andrew Stewart notes that artistic portraits are always partisan and that artistic portrayals of Alexander "seek to legitimize him (or, by extension, his Successors), to interpret him to their audiences, to answer their critiques, and to persuade them of his greatness", and thus should be considered within a framework of "praise and blame", in the same way sources such as praise poetry are. Nevertheless, though idealised, Lysippos's sculpture was thought to be the most faithful plastic representation.

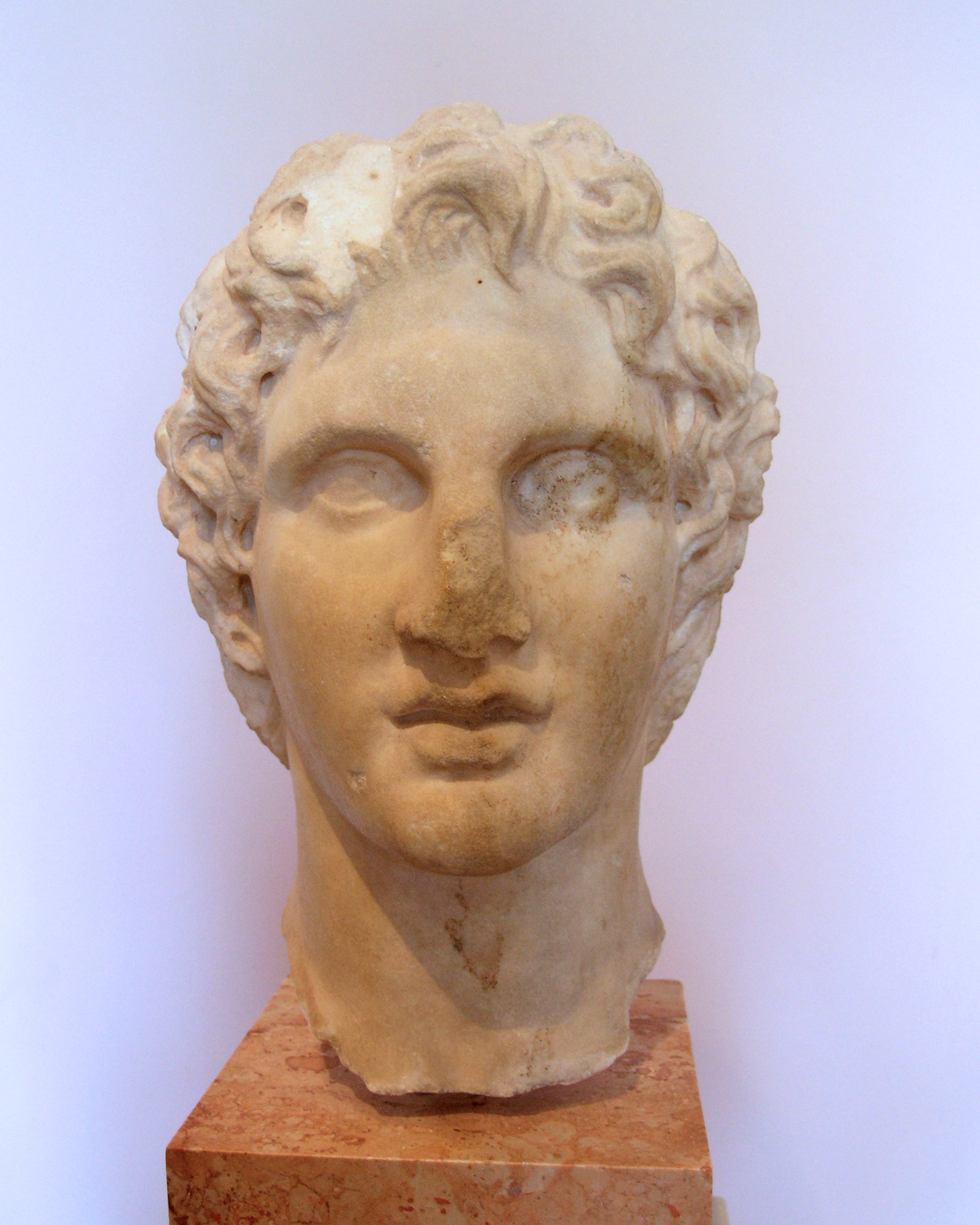
Head of Alexander the Great by Leochares, c. 330 BC

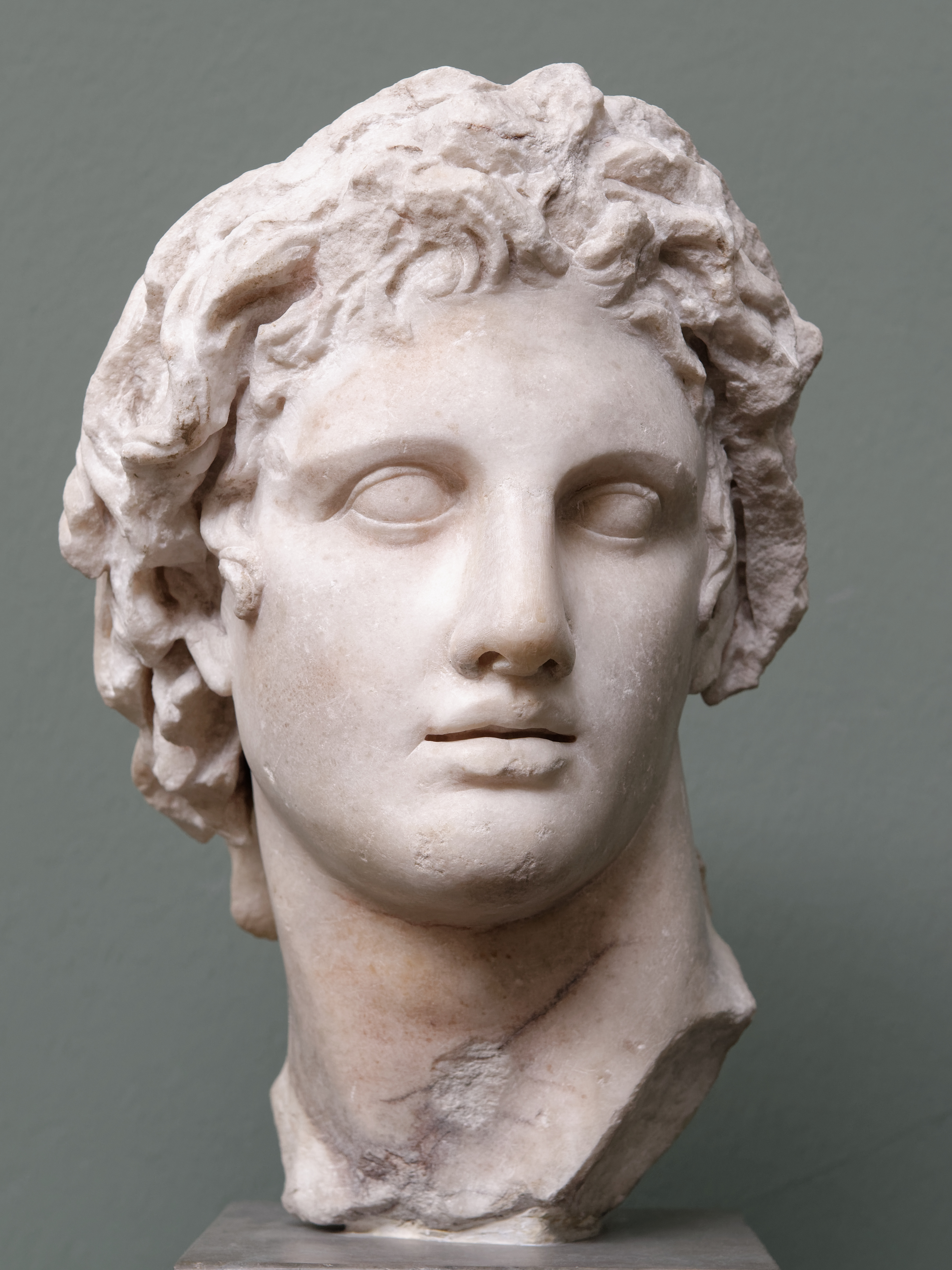
3rd century BC bust of Alexander from Alexandria, Egypt.

In the Histories of Alexander the Great, Curtius Rufus details Alexander sitting on Darius III's throne:

Then Alexander seating himself on the royal throne, which was far too high for his bodily stature. Therefore, since his feet did not reach its lowest step, one of the royal pages placed a table under his feet.

Curtius, Diodorus and Arrian report that Darius's mother, Sisygambis, at first mistook the taller and more imposing Hephaestion for Alexander.

The Greek biographer Plutarch (c. 45 – c. 120 AD) discusses the accuracy of Alexander's depictions:

The outward appearance of Alexander is best represented by the statues of him which Lysippus made, and it was by this artist alone that Alexander himself thought it fit that he should be modelled. For those peculiarities which many of his successors and friends afterwards tried to imitate, namely, the poise of the neck, which was bent slightly to the left, and the melting glance of his eyes, this artist has accurately observed. Apelles, however, in painting him as wielder of the thunder-bolt, did not reproduce his complexion, but made it too dark and swarthy. Whereas he was of a fair colour, as they say, and his fairness passed into ruddiness on his breast particularly, and in his face. Moreover, that a very pleasant odour exhaled from his skin and that there was a fragrance about his mouth and all his flesh, so that his garments were filled with it, this we have read in the Memoirs of Aristoxenus.

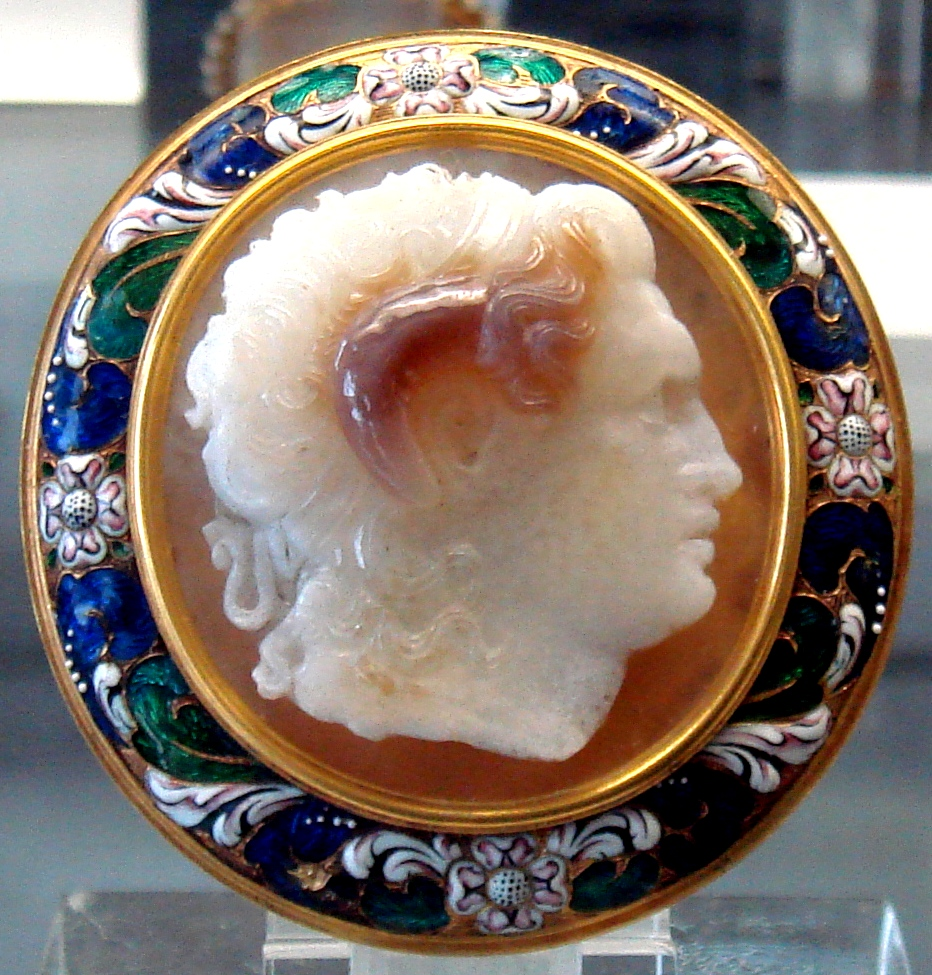
Alexander cameo by Pyrgoteles

Historians attribute the detail of the pleasant fragrance to an ancient Greek belief that gods and heroes possessed pleasant scents.

The Alexander Mosaic and contemporary coins portray Alexander with "a straight nose, a slightly protruding jaw, full lips and eyes deep set beneath a strongly pronounced forehead". He is also described as having a slight upward tilt of his head to the left. The ancient historian Aelian (c. 175 – c. 235 AD), in his Varia Historia (12.14), describes Alexander's hair color as "ξανθὴν" (xanthen), which at the time, could mean blond, brown or auburn. It is sometimes claimed that Alexander had one blue and one brown eye, derived from the fictional Alexander Romance that also claims Alexander had fangs and did not resemble his parents. Reconstruction, based on remaining traces of paint of the original polychromy on the Alexander Sarcophagus from Sidon, indicates that he was depicted with brown eyes and chestnut brown hair. The Acropolis Museum suggests that traces of red paint on a head statue of Alexander found in 1886 were most likely a base coat for golden hues to be painted over for his hair. The Pella mosaic of a lion hunt (late 4th century BC) depicts him as having blond hair, although the eye stones which would have included semi-precious gems, have been removed.

=== Personality ===
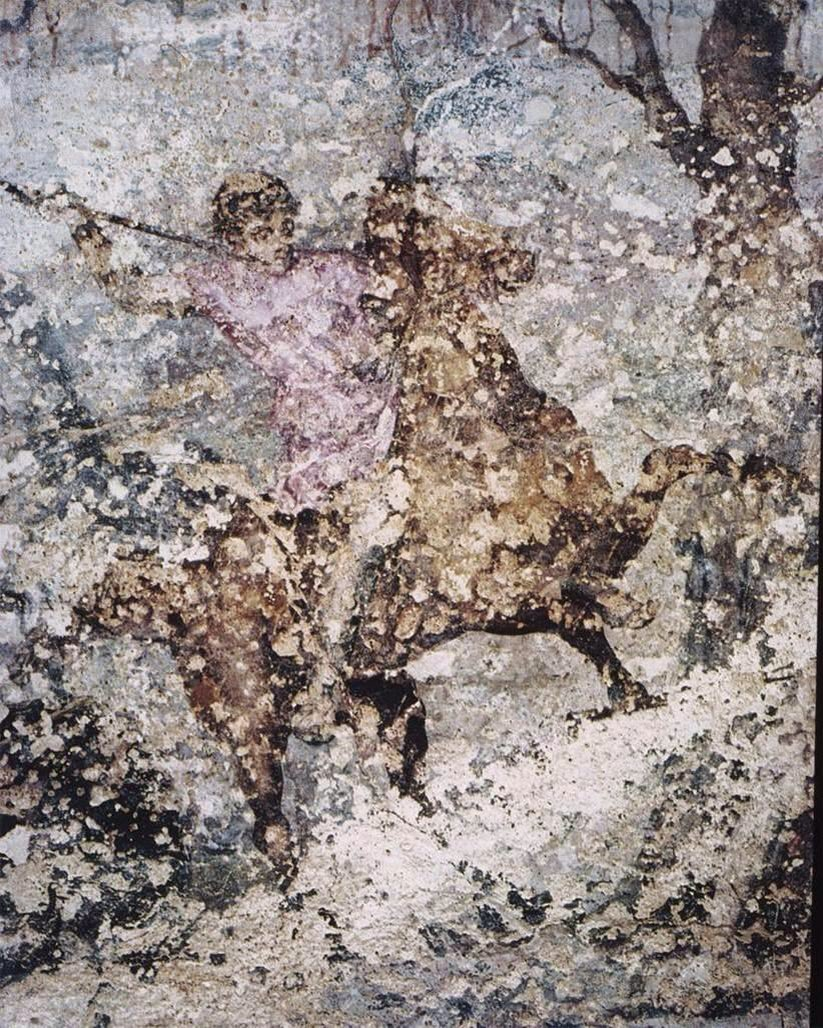
A fresco depicting a hunt scene at the tomb of Philip II at Aigai, one of the few known artistic depictions of Alexander securely made during his lifetime, 330s BC

Both of Alexander's parents encouraged his ambitions. His most influential role model was probably his father Philip, whom he watched campaign practically every year, winning successive victories while ignoring severe wounds. Alexander's relationship with his father cemented his competitive nature; he had a need to outdo his father, but he also downplayed his father's achievements to his companions. Alexander's mother Olympias similarly had huge ambitions, and encouraged her son to believe it was his destiny to conquer the Persian Empire. Plutarch tells how Alexander's ambition "kept his spirit serious and lofty in advance of his years".

According to Plutarch, Alexander also had a violent temper and rash, impulsive nature, which influenced his decisions. Although he was stubborn and resisted his father's orders, he was open to reasoned debate. He had a calmer side—perceptive, logical, and calculating. He had a great desire for knowledge, a love for philosophy, and was an avid reader. This was no doubt in part due to Aristotle's tutelage; Alexander was intelligent and quick to learn. His intelligence and rationality were demonstrated in his military skill. He had great self-restraint in bodily pleasures, in contrast with his lack of self-control with alcohol.

Alexander was erudite and patronized both arts and sciences. However, he lacked interest in sports or the Olympic Games (unlike his father), seeking only the Homeric ideals of honour (timê) and glory (kudos). His charisma and force of personality made him a great leader. His generals' inability to preserve the empire after his death further demonstrated his exceptional leadership.

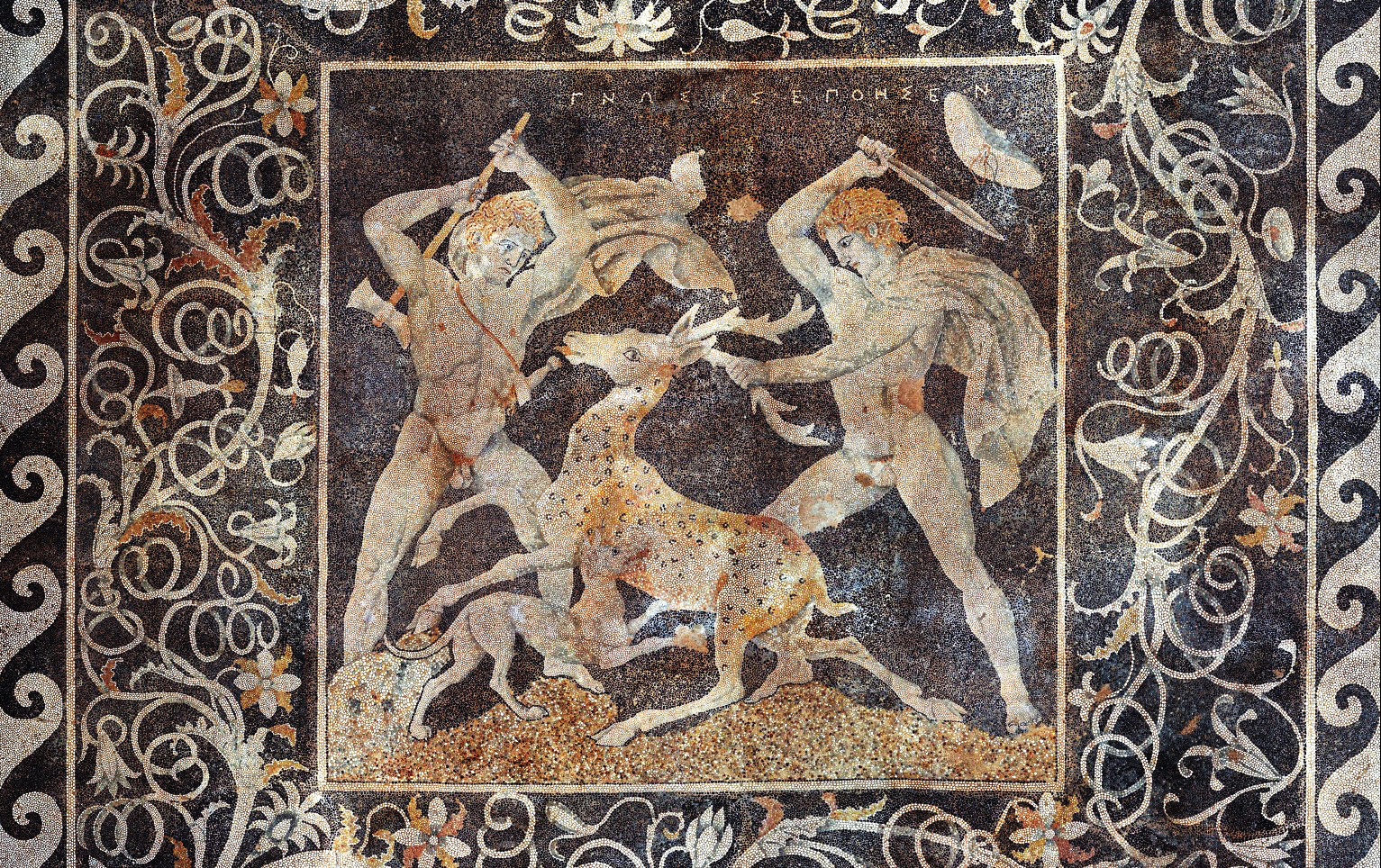
Stag Hunt Mosaic, the figure on the right possibly being Alexander, and the figure to the left wields a double-headed axe, likely alluding to Hephaistos; possibly meaning his friend and general Hephaestion

During his final years, and especially after the death of his closest friend Hephaestion, Alexander began to exhibit signs of megalomania and paranoia. His extraordinary achievements, his ineffable sense of destiny, and the flattery of his companions may have combined to produce this effect. His delusions of grandeur are readily visible in his will and in his desire to conquer the world; various sources describe his great ambition.

Alexander appears to have believed himself a deity, or at least sought to deify himself. His mother always told him Zeus was his father, an idea apparently confirmed to him by the oracle of Amun at Siwa. He began to identify himself as the son of Zeus-Ammon. His adoption of Persian customs such as proskynesis cost him the sympathies of many Macedonians, but he understood the difficulties of ruling culturally disparate peoples, many of whom lived in societies where the king was treated as divine. Thus, rather than megalomania, his behaviour may have been a practical attempt at strengthening his rule and keeping his empire together.

=== Personal relationships ===
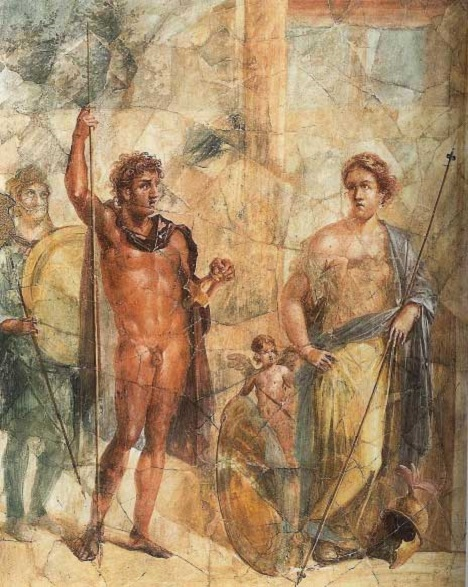
A mural in Pompeii, depicting the marriage of Alexander to Stateira in 324 BC; the couple is apparently dressed as Ares and Aphrodite.

Alexander married three times: Roxana, daughter of the Sogdian nobleman Oxyartes of Bactria, out of love; and two Persian princesses–King Darius III's daughter Stateira and King Artaxerxes III's daughter Parysatis–for political reasons. Alexander apparently had two children by Roxana: a son born in India who died in infancy in the autumn of 326 BC, and Alexander IV of Macedon, born after his father's death. Additionally, Heracles of Macedon was said to be his son by his mistress Barsine. Alexander seemingly acknowledged the boy and named him after his mythical ancestor; following the King's death, Heracles appears to have been treated as Alexander's child and to have lived alongside Alexander IV under the care of their father's companion Perdiccas until 321 BC.

Alexander had a close relationship with the Macedonian noble Hephaestion, who was his friend, general, bodyguard, and possible lover. Hephaestion's death devastated Alexander and may have contributed to Alexander's failing health and detached mental state during his final months. Green suggested that, in the context of the period, Alexander formed quite strong friendships with women, including Ada of Caria, who adopted him, and even Darius's mother Sisygambis, who supposedly died from grief upon hearing of Alexander's death.

=== Sexuality ===
Modern historians continue to debate Alexander's sexuality. Several ancient authors attributed to him various male lovers such as Hephaestion, Bagoas, Hector and Excipinos. Following the scholar Dicaearchus, Alexander's contemporary, the Greek writer Athenaeus states that Alexander "was quite excessively keen on boys"; he and Plutarch relate an episode in which Alexander kissed the eunuch Bagoas, whom Plutarch calls Alexander's eromenos ("beloved" or subordinate lover). Quintus Curtius Rufus also reports a sexual relationship between the two, claiming that Bagoas was "giving up his body to him [Alexander] (obsequio corporis devinxerat sibi)". Historian William Woodthorpe Tarn rejected the stories of Bagoas as ancient fabrications to defame Alexander. Badian countered Tarn's arguments, though his concern was the reliability of sources for Alexander rather than the figure of Bagoas himself. Daniel Ogden asserts the historicity of the pair's sexual relationship, but acknowledges that Curtius, who had bias against Alexander, used the King's affair with a man considered "effeminate" as an example of his moral failings.

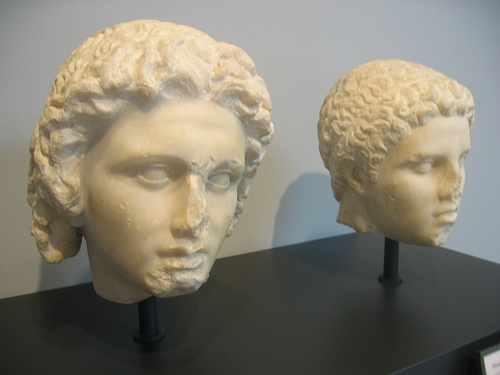
Alexander and Hephaestion, at the Getty Villa

While ancient writers do not conclusively identify Alexander and Hephaestion as lovers, several made ambiguous remarks regarding a possible affair between the two. The historian Justin implies the sexual relationship by claiming Alexander adored Hephaestion because of the latter's "beauty (forma) and boyishness (pueritia), and because of the services (obsequia) he performed for him [Alexander]." Lucian names among Alexander's errors his multiple marriages and excessive love for Hephaestion, though it is unclear whether by the latter he means the pair's sexual relationship or simply Alexander's ostentatious mourning for Hephaestion. Curtius Rufus implies Alexander having another male lover, Excipiones, "beloved to Alexander because of the flower of his [Excipinos's] youth". Curtius compares Excipiones to Hephaestion as "equaled [...] in the beauty of his body" but "not equal to him in manly charm", suggesting both Excipinos and Hephaestion were Alexander's lovers. Diodorus Siculus similarly describes how Hephaestion and Craterus competed for Alexander's attention, indirectly implying romantic rivalry between them.

Arrian mentions in Discourses of Epictetus that Alexander reportedly ordered the temple of Asclepius to be burnt after his (unnamed) eromenos had died; in Anabasis, Arrian writes that Alexander was said to commit such act after the death of Hephaestion – Ogden therefore argues that Hephaestion is the male lover from Discourses. Additionally, the pair was sometimes compared to Achilles and Patroclus, who were depicted as a couple in some post-homeric narrations. In the Cynic epistles, the letter attributed to Diogenes outwardly suggests the two men were lovers by claiming that Alexander was "controlled by Hephaestion's thighs", although the source's dubious nature make its reliability uncertain.

Some modern historians (e.g., Robin Lane Fox) believe that Alexander and Hephaestion's relationship was sexual from youth and into adulthood, which was socially unacceptable in at least some Greek cities, such as Athens. However, other researchers have tentatively proposed that Macedonia (or at least the Macedonian court) may have been more tolerant of adult homosexuality. Ogden compares a possible sexual relationship between the pair, who were similar in age, to same-sex relationships among adult male peers around the same time in Thebes, Elis and Sparta. He also notes the presence at the Macedonian court of other adult men known to have male lovers, suggesting some social tolerance.

Curtius mentions a youth named Hector as another male lover of Alexander and "particularly dear to Alexander (in pausis Alexandro carus)". According to Curtius, Hector died due to mortal injuries sustained after falling overboard from the boat on the Nile in 322/321 BC, and Alexander gave him a lavish funeral. Justin also attests to Hector's existence and death, but does not comment on the nature of his relationship with Alexander.

Peter Green argues there is little evidence in ancient sources that Alexander had much sexual interest in women; he did not produce an heir until the very end of his life. On the contrary, Ogden notes that Alexander, who had sired three sons in eight years – two with his wife Roxana and one with his mistress Barsine – fathered more children than his father at the same age. Mary Renault disputes the King's affair with Barsine and his paternity of her son Heracles by arguing this parentage was declared only twelve years after Alexander's death, with the purpose of political gain. However, her view is contradicted by Strabo's record, which suggests the boy was living under Perdiccas's guardianship as recognized son of Alexander already in 321 BC.

According to Diodorus Siculus, Alexander accumulated a Persian-style harem, but he used it rather sparingly, "not wishing to offend the Macedonians". Plutarch praises Alexander for not forcing himself on Roxana despite his apparent infatuation with her. Arrian also reports Alexander's restraint, noting that he did not attempt to seduce Darius III's wife, Stateira, while she was in his captivity.

== Battle record ==
Outcome	Date	War	Action	Opponent/s	Type	Country (present day)	Rank
Victory	2 August 338 BC	Philip II's submission of Greece	Battle of Chaeronea	Thebans, Athenians and other Greek cities	Battle	Greece	Prince
Victory	335 BC	Balkan Campaign	Battle of Mount Haemus	Getae, Thracians	Battle	Bulgaria	King
Victory	December 335 BC	Balkan Campaign	Siege of Pelium	Illyrians	Siege	Albania	King
Victory	December 335 BC	Balkan Campaign	Battle of Thebes	Thebans	Battle	Greece	King
Victory	May 334 BC	Persian Campaign	Battle of the Granicus	Achaemenid Empire	Battle	Turkey	King
Victory	334 BC	Persian Campaign	Siege of Miletus	Achaemenid Empire, Milesians	Siege	Turkey	King
Victory	334 BC	Persian Campaign	Siege of Halicarnassus	Achaemenid Empire	Siege	Turkey	King
Victory	5 November 333 BC	Persian Campaign	Battle of Issus	Achaemenid Empire	Battle	Turkey	King
Victory	January–July 332 BC	Persian Campaign	Siege of Tyre	Achaemenid Empire, Tyrians	Siege	Lebanon	King
Victory	October 332 BC	Persian Campaign	Siege of Gaza	Achaemenid Empire	Siege	Palestine	King
Victory	1 October 331 BC	Persian Campaign	Battle of Gaugamela	Achaemenid Empire	Battle	Iraq	King
Victory	December 331 BC	Persian Campaign	Battle of the Uxian Defile	Uxians	Battle	Iran	King
Victory	20 January 330 BC	Persian Campaign	Battle of the Persian Gate	Achaemenid Empire	Battle	Iran	King
Victory	329 BC	Persian Campaign	Siege of Cyropolis	Sogdians	Siege	Turkmenistan	King
Victory	October 329 BC	Persian Campaign	Battle of Jaxartes	Scythians	Battle	Uzbekistan	King
Victory	327 BC	Persian Campaign	Siege of the Sogdian Rock	Sogdians	Siege	Uzbekistan	King
Victory	April 326 BC	Cophen Campaign	Siege of Aornos	Aśvaka	Siege	Pakistan	King
Victory	May 326 BC	Indian Campaign	Battle of the Hydaspes	Porus	Battle	Pakistan	King
Victory	November 326 – February 325 BC	Mallian Campaign	Siege of the Mallian capital	Malli	Siege	Pakistan	King

== Legacy ==
Alexander's legacy extended beyond his military conquests, and his reign marked a turning point in European and Asian history. His campaigns greatly increased contacts and trade between East and West, and vast areas to the east were significantly exposed to Greek civilization and influence. Some of the cities he founded became major cultural centers, many surviving into the 21st century. His chroniclers recorded valuable information about the areas through which he marched, while the Greeks themselves got a sense of belonging to a world beyond the Mediterranean.

=== Hellenistic kingdoms ===
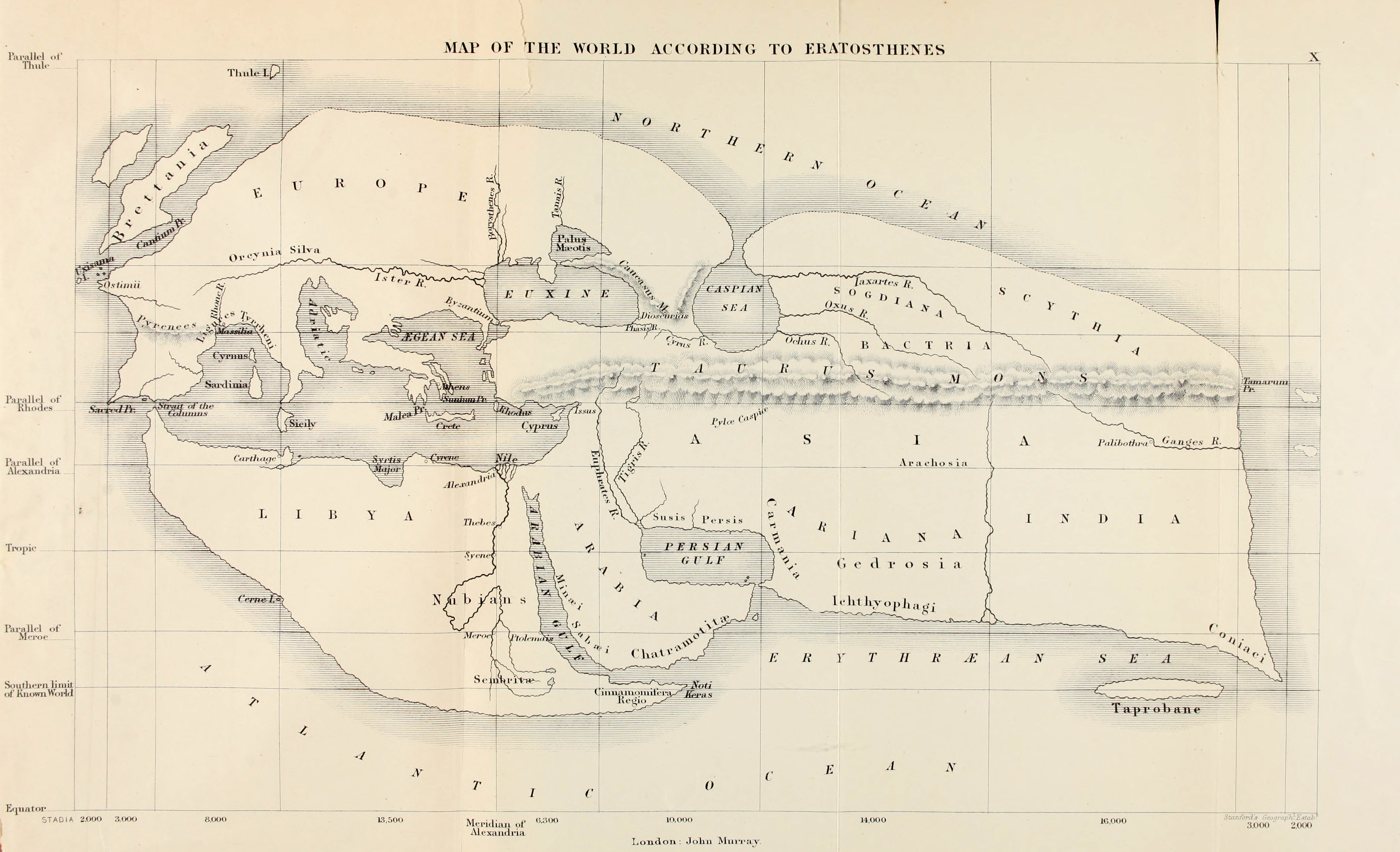
The Hellenistic world: A world map by Eratosthenes (276–194 BC), using information from the campaigns of Alexander and his successors

Alexander's most immediate legacy was the introduction of Macedonian rule to huge new swathes of Asia. At the time of his death, his empire covered some 5,200,000 km^{2} (2,000,000 sq mi), and was the largest state of its time. Many of these areas remained in Macedonian hands or under Greek influence for the next 200–300 years. The successor states that emerged were, at least initially, dominant forces, and these 300 years are often referred to as the Hellenistic period.

The eastern borders of Alexander's empire began to collapse even during his lifetime. However, the power vacuum he left in the northwest of the Indian subcontinent directly gave rise to one of the most powerful Indian dynasties in history, the Maurya Empire. Taking advantage of this power vacuum, Chandragupta Maurya, of relatively humble origin, took control of the Punjab, and proceeded to conquer the Nanda Empire.

=== Founding of cities ===
Plan of Alexandria c. 30 BC

Over the course of his conquests, Alexander founded many cities that bore his name, most of them east of the Tigris. The first, and greatest, was Alexandria in Egypt, which would become one of the leading Mediterranean cities. The cities' locations reflected trade routes as well as defensive positions. At first, the cities must have been inhospitable, little more than defensive garrisons. Following Alexander's death, many Greeks who had settled there tried to return to Greece. However, a century or so after his death, many of the Alexandrias were thriving, with elaborate public buildings and substantial populations that included both Greek and local peoples.

=== Funding of temples ===
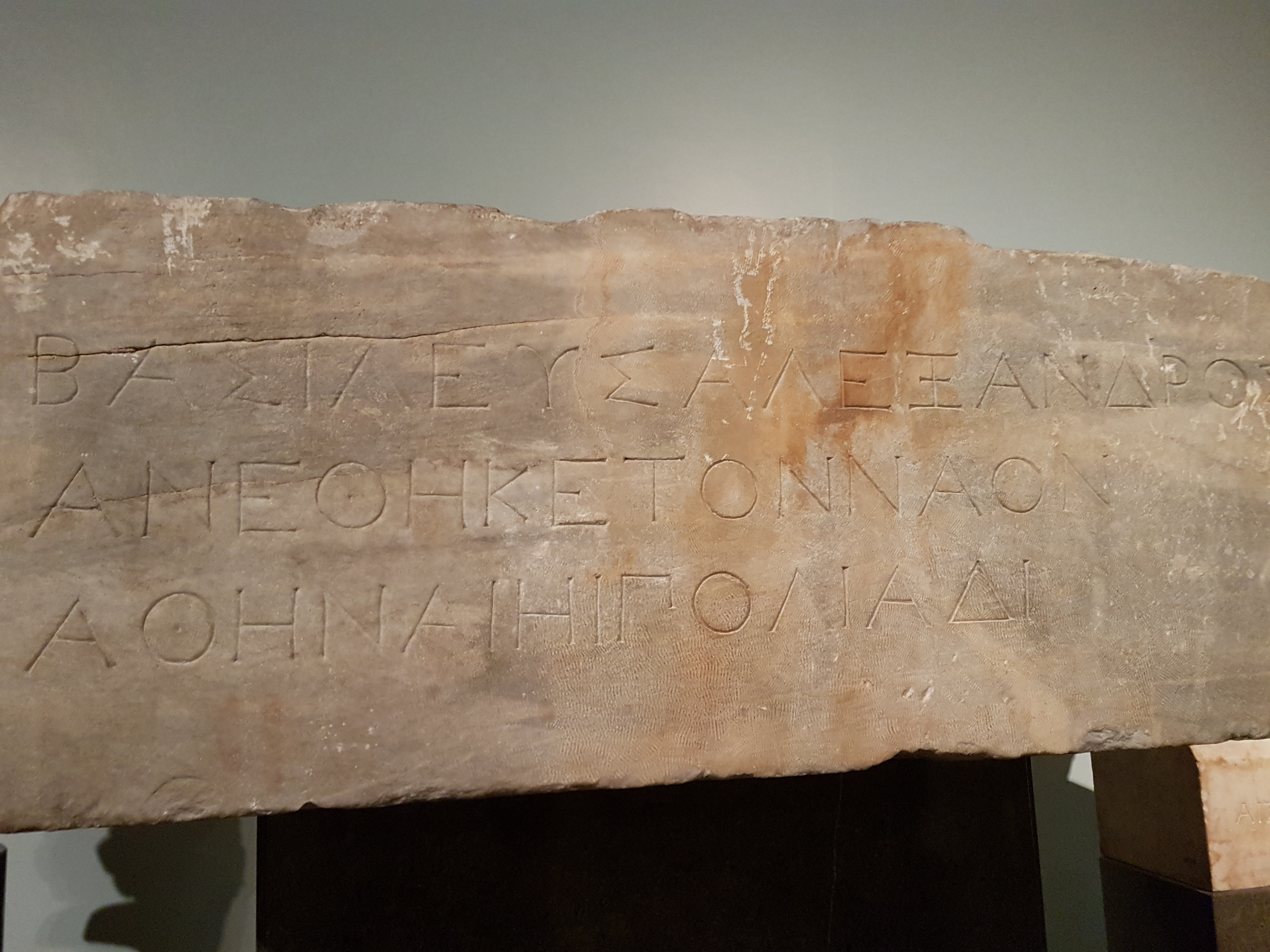
Dedication of Alexander the Great to Athena Polias at Priene, now housed in the British Museum

In 334 BC, Alexander donated funds for the completion of the new temple of Athena Polias in Priene, in modern-day western Turkey. An inscription from the temple, now housed in the British Museum, declares: "King Alexander dedicated [this temple] to Athena Polias." This inscription is one of the few independent archaeological discoveries confirming an episode from Alexander's life. The temple was designed by Pytheos, one of the architects of the Mausoleum at Halicarnassus. Sophist philosopher Libanius wrote that Alexander founded the temple of Zeus Bottiaios (Ancient Greek: Βοττιαίου Δῖός), in the place where later the city of Antioch was built. Similarly Suda wrote that Alexander built a large temple to Sarapis.

In 2023, British Museum experts suggested that Alexander might have founded a Greek temple at Girsu in Iraq. The researchers stated that recent discoveries imply "this site honours Zeus and two divine sons. The sons are Heracles and Alexander."

=== Hellenization ===
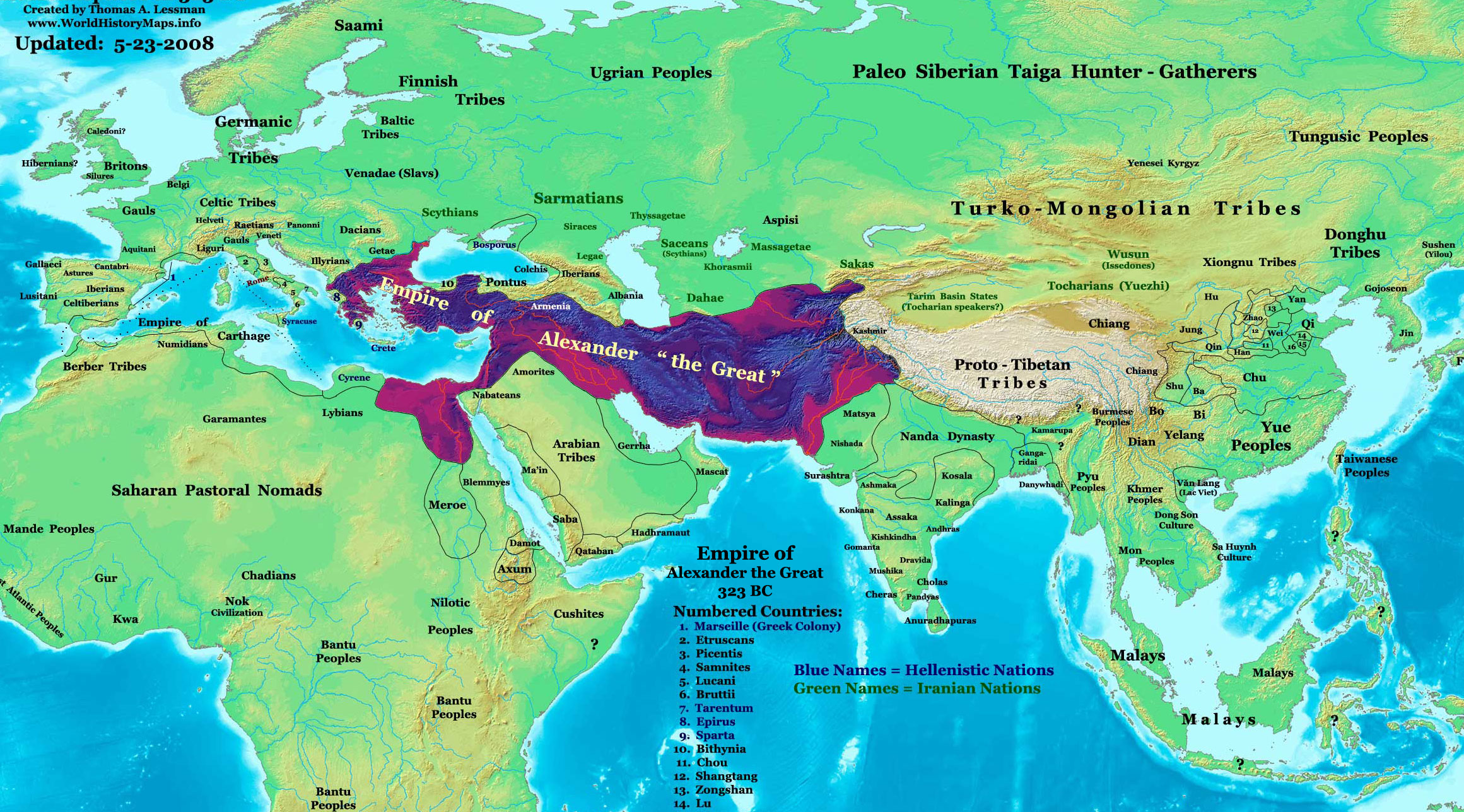
Alexander's empire was the largest state of its time, covering approximately 5.2 million square km.

The term Hellenization was coined by the German historian Johann Gustav Droysen to denote the spread of Greek language, culture, and population into the former Persian empire after Alexander's conquest. This process can be seen in such great Hellenistic cities as Alexandria, Antioch and Seleucia (south of modern Baghdad). Alexander sought to insert Greek elements into Persian culture and to hybridize Greek and Persian culture, homogenizing the populations of Asia and Europe. Although his successors explicitly rejected such policies, Hellenization occurred throughout the region, accompanied by a distinct and opposite 'Orientalization' of the successor states.

The core of the Hellenistic culture promulgated by the conquests was essentially Athenian. The close association of men from across Greece in Alexander's army directly led to the emergence of the largely Attic-based "koine", or "common" Greek dialect. Koine spread throughout the Hellenistic world, becoming the lingua franca of Hellenistic lands, and eventually the ancestor of modern Greek. Furthermore, town planning, education, local government, and art current in the Hellenistic period were all based on Classical Greek ideals, evolving into distinct new forms commonly grouped as Hellenistic. Also, the New Testament was written in the Koine Greek language. Aspects of Hellenistic culture were still evident in the traditions of the Byzantine Empire in the mid-15th century.

==== Hellenization in South and Central Asia ====
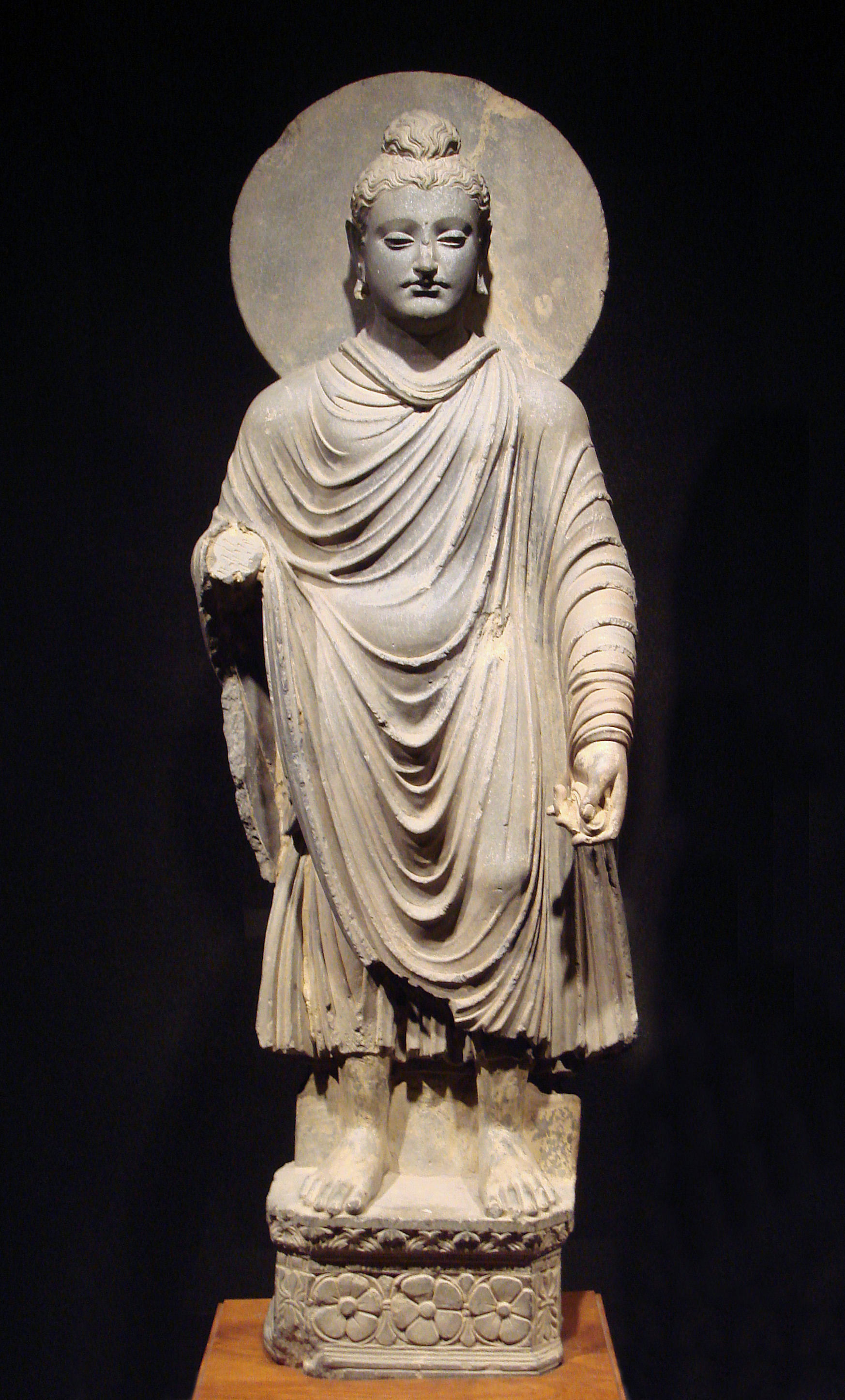
Standing Buddha from Gandhara, in Greco-Buddhist style, 1st to 2nd century AD, Gandhara, northern Pakistan. Tokyo National Museum.

Some of the most pronounced effects of Hellenization can be seen in Afghanistan and India, in the region of the relatively late-rising Greco-Bactrian Kingdom (250–125 BC) (in modern Afghanistan, Pakistan, and Tajikistan) and the Indo-Greek Kingdom (180 BC – 10 AD) in modern Afghanistan, Pakistan and India. On the Silk Road trade routes, Hellenistic culture hybridized with Iranian and Buddhist cultures. The cosmopolitan art and mythology of Gandhara (a region spanning the upper confluence of the Indus, Swat and Kabul rivers in modern Pakistan) of the 3rd century BC to the 5th century AD are most evident of the direct contact between Hellenistic civilization and South Asia, as are the Edicts of Ashoka, which directly mention the Greeks in Ashoka's dominion as converting to Buddhism and the reception of Buddhist emissaries by Ashoka's contemporaries in the Hellenistic world. The resulting syncretism known as Greco-Buddhism influenced the development of Buddhism and created a culture of Greco-Buddhist art. These Greco-Buddhist kingdoms sent some of the first Buddhist missionaries to China, Sri Lanka and Hellenistic Asia and Europe (Greco-Buddhist monasticism).

Some of the first and most influential figurative portrayals of The Buddha appeared at this time, perhaps modelled on Greek statues of Apollo in the Greco-Buddhist style. The ancient Greek religion may have influenced several Buddhist traditions: the concept of Boddhisatvas is reminiscent of Greek divine heroes, and some Mahayana ceremonial practices (burning incense, gifts of flowers, and food placed on altars) are similar to those practised by the ancient Greeks; however, similar practices were also observed amongst the native Indic culture. One Greek king, Menander I, probably became Buddhist, and was immortalized in Buddhist literature as 'Milinda'. The process of Hellenization also spurred trade between the east and west. For example, Greek astronomical instruments dating to the 3rd century BC were found in the Greco-Bactrian city of Ai Khanoum in modern-day Afghanistan, while the Greek concept of a spherical Earth surrounded by the spheres of planets eventually supplanted the long-standing Indian cosmological belief of a disc consisting of four continents grouped around a central mountain (Mount Meru) like the petals of a flower. The Yavanajataka (lit. 'Greek astronomical treatise') and Paulisa Siddhanta texts depict the influence of Greek astronomical ideas on Indian astronomy.

Following the conquests of Alexander the Great in the east, Hellenistic influence on Indian art was far-reaching. In architecture, a few examples of the Ionic order can be found as far as Pakistan with the Jandial temple near Taxila. Several examples of capitals displaying Ionic influences can be seen as far as Patna, especially with the Pataliputra capital, dated to the 3rd century BC. The Corinthian order is also heavily represented in the art of Gandhara, especially through Indo-Corinthian capitals.

=== Influence on Rome ===
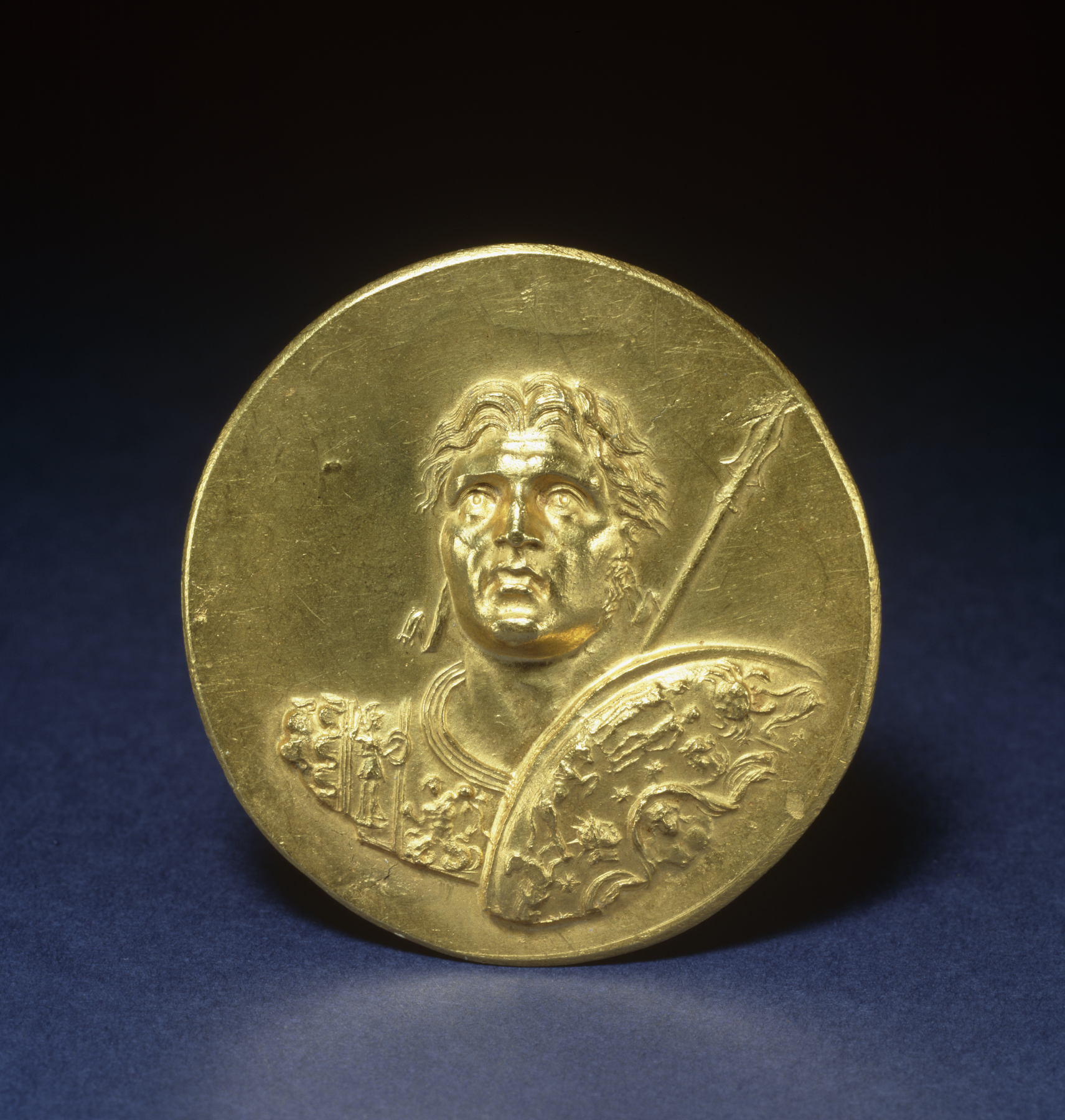
This medallion was produced in Imperial Rome, demonstrating the influence of Alexander's memory. Walters Art Museum, Baltimore.

Many Romans admired Alexander and his exploits, especially generals who wanted to associate themselves with his achievements. Polybius began his Histories by reminding Romans of Alexander's achievements, and thereafter Roman leaders saw him as a role model; these included Pompey, Julius Caesar, and emperors Augustus, Nero, Trajan, and Caracalla. (Note: Pompey adopted the epithet Magnus ("the Great"), which the Roman dictator Sulla reportedly granted him. Alexander was Pompey's boyhood hero and Pompey sought to emulate him as the "new Alexander". He wore Alexander's anastole-type haircut and searched the conquered lands of the east for Alexander's 260-year-old cloak, which he then wore as a sign of greatness. Julius Caesar went to serve his quaestorship in Hispania after the funeral of his wife Cornelia, in the spring or early summer of 69 BC. While there, he encountered a statue of Alexander, and realised with dissatisfaction that he was now at an age when Alexander had the world at his feet, while he had achieved comparatively little. Later, Caesar dedicated a Lysippean bronze equestrian statue, but replaced Alexander's head with his own. Augustus, as Octavian, is considered to have ended the Hellenistic period that started with Alexander's death, invading Ptolemaic Egypt and defeating Queen Cleopatra in 30 BC. Nevertheless, he greatly admired Alexander and based his portraits on those of the Macedonian king. After visiting Alexander's tomb in Alexandria, Octavian temporarily changed his seal from a sphinx to Alexander's profile. After Caracalla concluded his campaign against the Alamanni, it became evident that he was inordinately preoccupied with Alexander. He began openly mimicking Alexander in his personal style. In planning his invasion of the Parthian Empire, Caracalla decided to arrange 16,000 of his men in Macedonian-style phalanxes, despite the Roman army having made the phalanx an obsolete tactical formation. However, historian Christopher Matthew states that the Phalangarii of Caracalla's Parthian legion may not have been pikemen, but rather standard battle line troops or possibly Triarii. Caracalla's mania for Alexander went so far that he visited Alexandria while preparing for his Parthian invasion and persecuted Aristotelian philosophers based on a legend that Aristotle had poisoned Alexander.) The Macriani, a Roman family that briefly ascended to the imperial throne, kept images of Alexander on their persons, either on jewellery or embroidered into their clothes. Historian Robert Malcolm Errington states that Hellenistic influence in West Asia and North Africa served as a "precondition" for the later Roman expansion into these territories and entire basis for the Byzantine Empire. On the other hand, some Roman writers, particularly figures of the Roman Republic, used Alexander as a cautionary tale of how republican values could restrain autocratic tendencies. They detailed him as an example of ruler values such as amicitia (friendship) and clementia (clemency), but also iracundia (anger) and cupiditas gloriae (over-desire for glory). In his satire The Caesars, Emperor Julian describes a contest between the previous Roman emperors, with Alexander the Great called in as an extra contestant, in the presence of the assembled gods. The Itinerarium Alexandri is a 4th-century Latin description of Alexander's campaigns.

In AD 39, Caligula performed a spectacular stunt by ordering a temporary floating bridge to be built using ships as pontoons, stretching for over two miles from the resort of Baiae to the neighbouring port of Puteoli. It was said that the bridge was to rival Xerxes's pontoon bridges, which the Persian king used to cross the Hellespont. Caligula, who could not swim, then proceeded to ride his favourite horse Incitatus across, wearing the breastplate of Alexander the Great, defying a prediction by the soothsayer Thrasyllus of Mendes that Caligula had "no more chance of becoming emperor than of riding a horse across the Bay of Baiae".

=== Letters ===
Alexander wrote and received numerous letters, but no originals survive. A few official letters addressed to the Greek cities survive in copies inscribed in stone and the content of others is sometimes reported in historical sources. These only occasionally quote the letters and it is an open question how reliable such quotations are. Several fictitious letters, some perhaps based on actual letters, made their way into the Romance tradition.

=== In legend ===
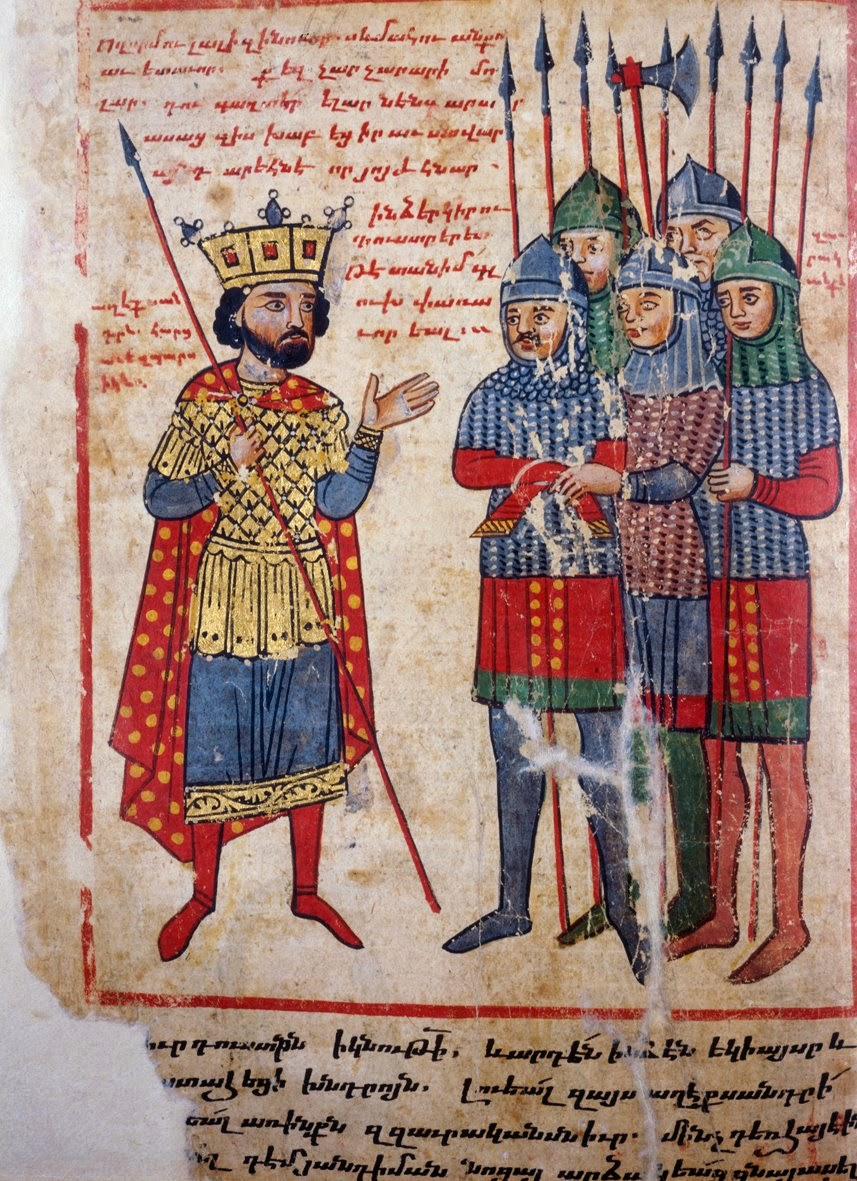
Alexander in a 14th-century Armenian manuscript

Many of the legends about Alexander derive from his own lifetime, probably encouraged by Alexander himself. His court historian Callisthenes portrayed the sea in Cilicia as drawing back from him in proskynesis. Writing shortly after Alexander's death, Onesicritus invented a tryst between Alexander and Thalestris, queen of the mythical Amazons. He reportedly read this passage to his patron King Lysimachus, who had been one of Alexander's generals and who quipped, "I wonder where I was at the time."

In the first centuries after Alexander's death, probably in Alexandria, a quantity of the legendary material coalesced into a text known as the Alexander Romance, later falsely ascribed to Callisthenes and therefore known as Pseudo-Callisthenes. This text underwent over one hundred recensions, translations, and derivations throughout the Islamic and European worlds in premodern times, containing many dubious stories, and was translated into twenty-five languages, for example Middle Persian, Syriac and Arabic.

=== In ancient and modern culture ===
Byzantine-style depiction of Alexander in the 14th-century Trebizond Alexander Romance

Alexander's accomplishments and legacy have been depicted in many cultures. Alexander has featured in both high and popular culture, beginning from his own era to the present day. The Alexander Romance, in particular, has impacted portrayals of Alexander in later cultures, from Persian to medieval European, to modern Greek.

Alexander features prominently in modern Greek folklore, more than any other ancient figure. The colloquial form of his name in modern Greek ("O Megalexandros") is a household name, and he is the only ancient hero to appear in the Karagiozis shadow play. One well-known fable among Greek seamen involves a solitary mermaid who would grasp a ship's prow during a storm and ask the captain, "Is King Alexander alive?" The answer should be "He is alive and well and rules the world!" causing the mermaid to vanish and the sea to calm. Any other answer would cause the mermaid to turn into a raging Gorgon who would drag the ship to the bottom of the sea, all hands aboard.

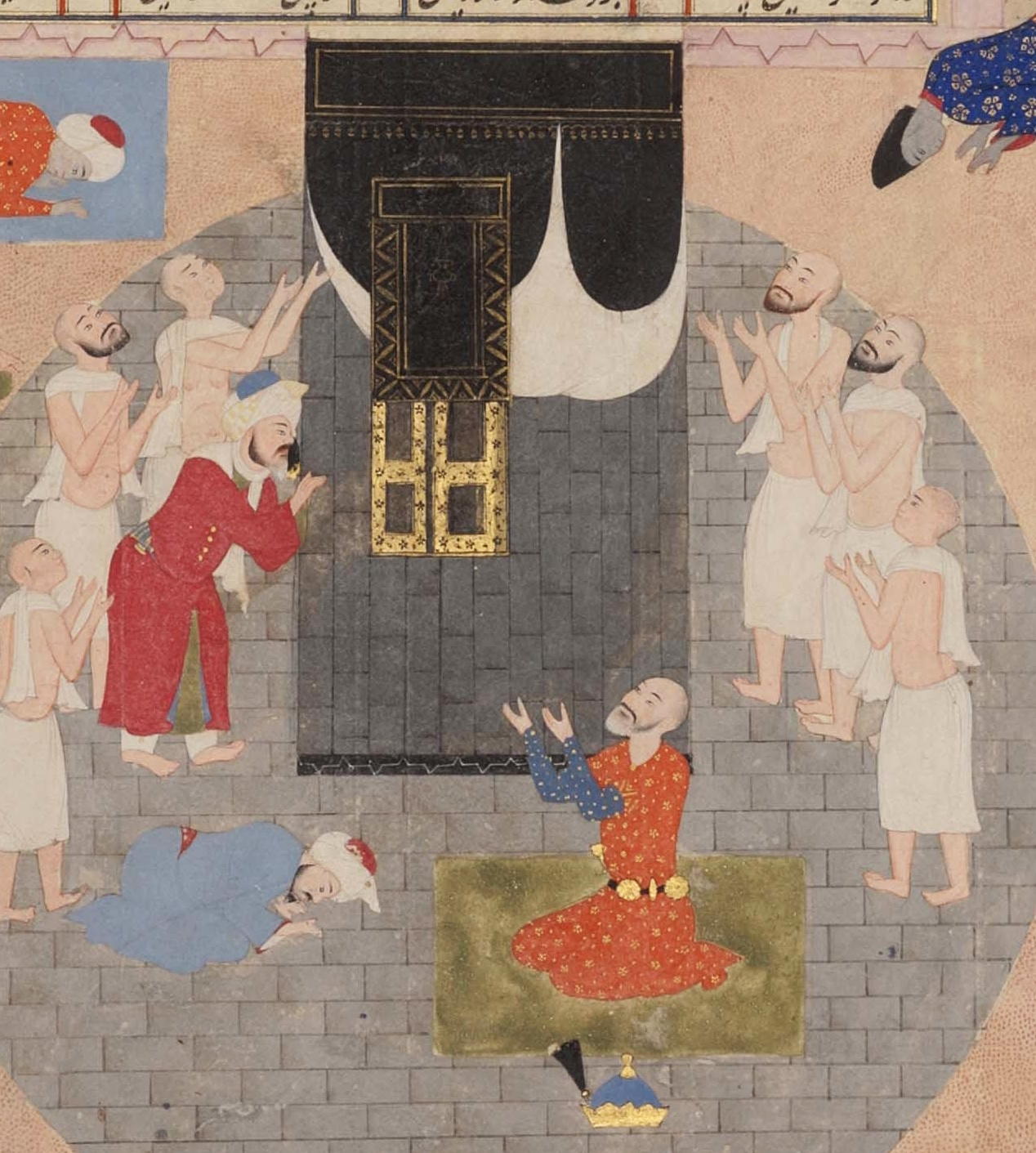
Folio from the Shahnameh showing Alexander praying at the Kaaba, mid-16th century

In pre-Islamic Middle Persian (Zoroastrian) literature, Alexander is referred to by the epithet gujastak, meaning "accursed", and is accused of destroying temples and burning the sacred texts of Zoroastrianism. In Islamic Persia, under the influence of the Alexander Romance (in Persian: اسکندرنامه Iskandarnameh), a more positive portrayal of Alexander emerges. Firdausi's Shahnameh ("The Book of Kings") includes Alexander in a line of legitimate Persian shahs, a mythical figure who explored the far reaches of the world in search of the Fountain of Youth. In the Shahnameh, Alexander's first journey is to Mecca to pray at the Kaaba. Alexander was depicted as performing a Hajj (pilgrimage to Mecca) many times in subsequent Islamic art and literature. Later Persian writers associate him with philosophy, portraying him at a symposium with figures such as Socrates, Plato and Aristotle, in search of immortality.

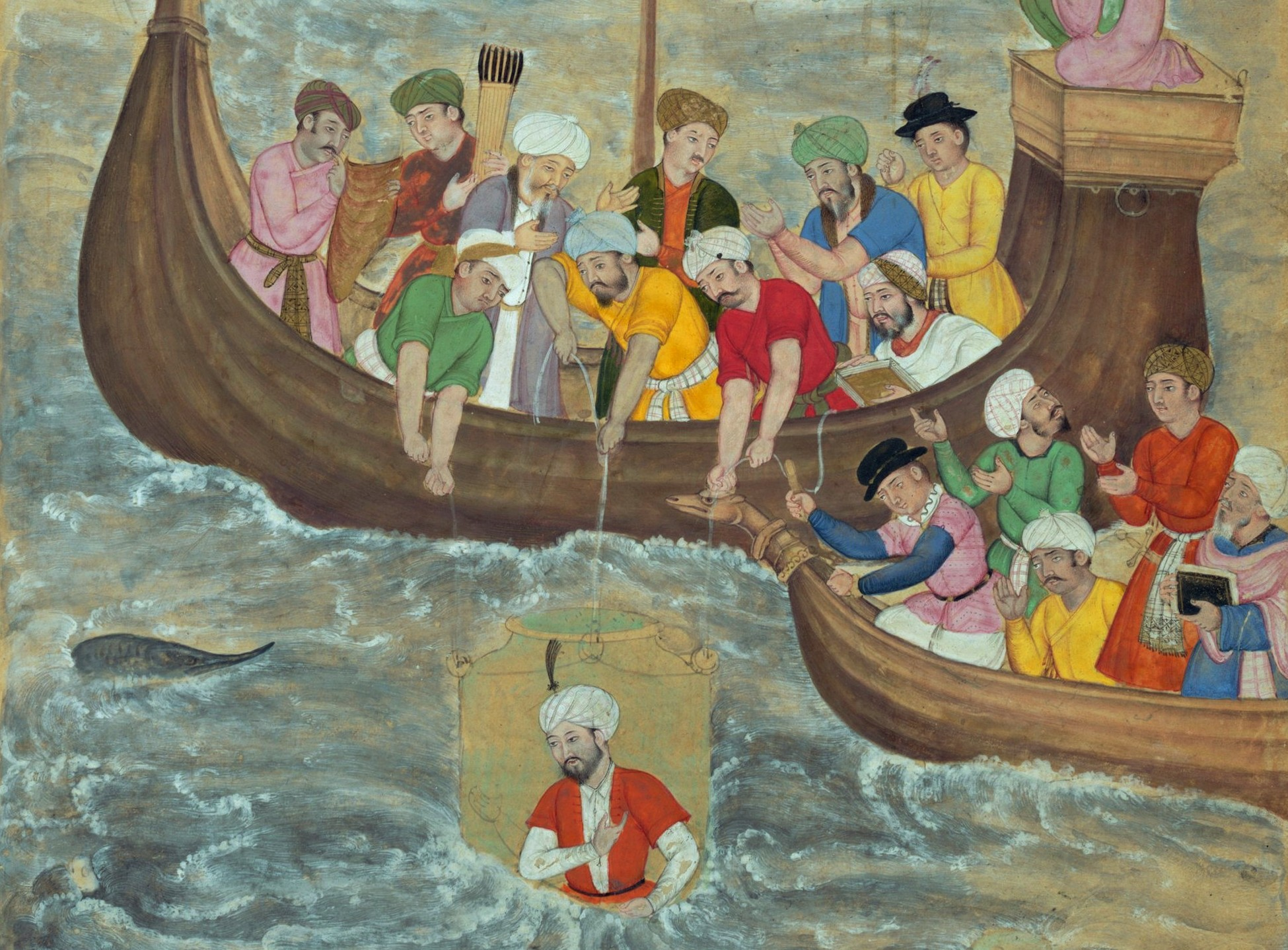
Detail of a 16th-century Islamic painting depicting Alexander being lowered in a glass submersible

The figure of Dhu al-Qarnayn (Arabic: ذو القرنين; lit. 'The Two-Horned One') is believed by the majority of modern researchers of the Qur'an as well as Islamic commentators to be a reference to Alexander. Scholars also believe the figure is based on later legends of Alexander. In this tradition, he was a heroic figure who built a wall to defend against the nations of Gog and Magog. He also travelled the known world in search of the Water of Life and Immortality, eventually becoming a prophet.

The Syriac version of the Alexander Romance portrays Alexander as an ideal Christian world conqueror who prayed to "the one true God". In Egypt, Alexander was portrayed as the son of Nectanebo II, the last pharaoh before the Persian conquest. His defeat of Darius was depicted as Egypt's salvation, "proving" Egypt was still ruled by an Egyptian. According to Josephus, Alexander was shown the Book of Daniel when he entered Jerusalem, which described a mighty Greek king who would conquer the Persian Empire. This is cited as a reason for sparing Jerusalem.

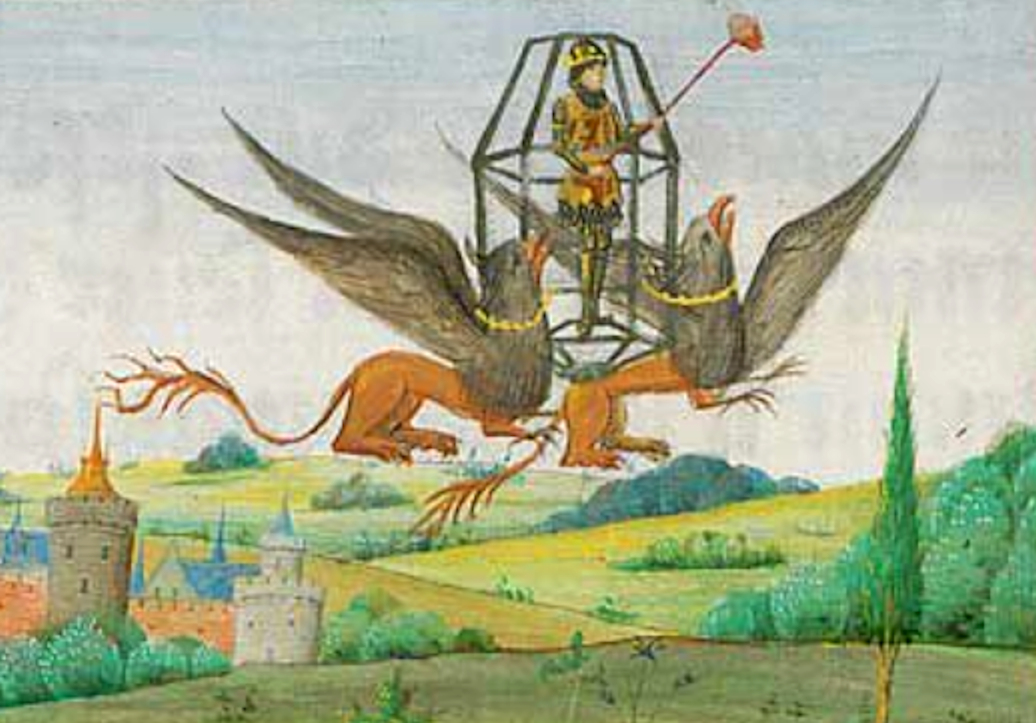
Alexander conquering the air. Jean Wauquelin, Les faits et conquêtes d'Alexandre le Grand, 1448–1449

In Hindi and Urdu, the name "Sikandar", derived from the Persian name for Alexander, denotes a rising young talent, and the Delhi Sultanate ruler Alauddin Khalji stylized himself as "Sikandar-i-Sani" (the Second Alexander the Great). In medieval India, Turkic and Afghan sovereigns from the Iranian-cultured region of Central Asia brought positive cultural connotations of Alexander to the Indian subcontinent, resulting in the efflorescence of Sikandernameh (Alexander Romances) written by Indo-Persian poets such as Amir Khusrau and Alexander's prominence as a popular subject in Mughal-era Persian miniatures. Alexander's legacy would also be evoked in Southeast Asia, with the rulers of the Malacca Sultanate claiming their descent all the way back to him as "Raja Iskander Zul-karnain" (Alexander of the Two Horns). Multiple Southeast Asian sultans have used the name "Iskander". Medieval Europeans revered Alexander as a member of the Nine Worthies; a group of heroes whose lives were believed to encapsulate all the ideal qualities of chivalry. During the Italian campaigns of the French Revolutionary Wars, when Bourrienne asked Napoleon Bonaparte whether he gave his preference to Alexander or Caesar, Bonaparte said that he placed Alexander in the first rank, the main reason being his campaign on Asia.

== Historiography ==
Apart from a few inscriptions and fragments, texts written by people who actually knew Alexander or who gathered information from his troops were all lost. Contemporaries who wrote accounts of his life included Alexander's campaign historian Callisthenes, generals Ptolemy and Nearchus, chief helmsman Onesicritus, and Aristobulus, a junior officer on the campaigns. Their works are lost, but later works based on these original sources have survived. The earliest of these is Diodorus Siculus (1st century BC), followed by Quintus Curtius Rufus (mid-to-late 1st century AD), Arrian (1st to 2nd century AD), the biographer Plutarch (1st to 2nd century AD), and finally Justin, whose work dated as late as the 4th century. Of these, Arrian is generally considered the most reliable, given that he used Ptolemy and Aristobulus as his sources, closely followed by Diodorus.

== See also ==
- Aigai – Original capital of Macedon
- Alexander the Great in Islamic tradition
- Alexander the Great Marathon
- Chronology of European exploration of Asia
- Military tactics of Alexander the Great
- Ptolemaic cult of Alexander the Great – Imperial cult in Hellenistic Egypt
- Theories about Alexander the Great in the Quran

=== Lists ===
- List of biblical figures identified in extra-biblical sources
- List of people known as The Great

== Notes ==
Alexander the Great Argead dynasty Born: 356 BC Died: 323 BC
Regnal titles
Preceded by Philip II	King of Macedon; 336–323 BC	Succeeded by Philip III; Alexander IV
Preceded by Darius III	King of Persia; 330–323 BC	Succeeded by Philip III; Alexander IV
Preceded by Darius III	Pharaoh of Egypt; 332–323 BC	Succeeded by Philip III; Alexander IV
New creation	Lord of Asia; 331–323 BC	Succeeded by Philip III; Alexander IV
