= 328 BC =

328 BC in various calendars
- Gregorian calendar: 328 BC; CCCXXVIII BC
- Ab urbe condita: 426
- Ancient Egypt era: XXXII dynasty, 5
- Pharaoh: Alexander the Great, 5
- Ancient Greek Olympiad (summer): 113th Olympiad (victor)¹
- Assyrian calendar: 4423
- Balinese saka calendar: N/A
- Bengali calendar: −921 – −920
- Berber calendar: 623
- Buddhist calendar: 217
- Burmese calendar: −965
- Byzantine calendar: 5181–5182
- Chinese calendar: 壬辰年 (Water Dragon); 2370 or 2163 — to — 癸巳年 (Water Snake); 2371 or 2164
- Coptic calendar: −611 – −610
- Discordian calendar: 839
- Ethiopian calendar: −335 – −334
- Hebrew calendar: 3433–3434
- Hindu calendars
- Vikram Samvat: −271 – −270
- Shaka Samvat: N/A
- Kali Yuga: 2773–2774
- Holocene calendar: 9673
- Iranian calendar: 949 BP – 948 BP
- Islamic calendar: 978 BH – 977 BH
- Javanese calendar: N/A
- Julian calendar: N/A
- Korean calendar: 2006
- Minguo calendar: 2239 before ROC 民前2239年
- Nanakshahi calendar: −1795
- Thai solar calendar: 215–216
- Tibetan calendar: ཆུ་ཕོ་འབྲུག་ལོ་ (male Water-Dragon) −201 or −582 or −1354 — to — ཆུ་མོ་སྦྲུལ་ལོ་ (female Water-Snake) −200 or −581 or −1353

Year 328 BC was a year of the pre-Julian Roman calendar. At the time, it was known as the Year of the Consulship of Proculus and Scapula or Decianus and Barbatus (or, less frequently, year 426 Ab urbe condita). The denomination 328 BC for this year has been used since the early medieval period, when the Anno Domini calendar era became the prevalent method in Europe for naming years.

== Events ==
=== By place ===
==== Macedonian Empire ====
- At Maracanda, Alexander murders Cleitus, one of his most trusted commanders, friend and foster-brother, in a drunken quarrel; but his excessive display of remorse leads the army to pass a decree convicting Cleitus posthumously of treason.
- Spitamenes raises all Sogdiana in revolt behind him, bringing in the Massagetae, a people of the Scythian confederacy. He besieges the Macedonian garrison in Maracanda. Alexander the Great sends an army under the command of Pharnuches of Lycia which is promptly annihilated with a loss of more than 2,000 infantry and 300 cavalry.
- Understanding now the danger represented by his enemy, Alexander moves personally to relieve Maracanda, only to learn that Spitamenes has left Sogdiana. Spitamenes then attacks Bactra, from where he is repulsed with great difficulty by the satrap of Bactria, Artabazus of Phrygia.
- Alexander attacks Oxyartes and the remaining Bactrian barons who are holding out in the hills of Paraetacene (modern Tajikistan). The Macedonians seize the crag on which Oxyartes has his stronghold (the Sogdian Rock), and among the captives is his daughter, Roxana. In the reconciliation that follows the battle, Alexander marries Roxana. The rest of Oxyartes' opponents are either won over or crushed.
- December – Spitamenes is badly defeated by Alexander's general Coenus. At this point Spitamenes' allies, feeling the situation desperate, kill their leader and send his head as a gift to Alexander.

== Deaths ==
- Cleitus, lieutenant and friend of Alexander the Great (b. c. 375 BC)
- Spitamenes, Persian nobleman (b. 370 BC)
- Artabazos II, Persian general and satrap (fl. 389 BC)
