= Barsinia =

Coordinates: 32°31′56.6″N 35°46′23.5″E

- Khirbet Barsiniya, Bersinia, Tell Barsina
- Location within Jordan
- Type: Archaeological site
- Periods: Iron Age II–Ottoman period
- Location: Dayr a-Si'na, Irbid Governorate, Jordan
- Region: Northern highlands (Gilead)
- Nearest city: Irbid

Site notes
- Elevation: 570 metres (1,870 ft)
- Area: 11,200 m^{2} (1.12 ha)
- Excavation dates: 2006, 2007
- Archaeologists: Lamia El-Khouri

Barsinia, Bersinia, Tell Barsina or Khirbet Barsiniya is an archaeological site in northern Jordan, located near the village of Dayr a-Si'na, west of Irbid. Excavations have revealed evidence of largely continuous settlement spanning the Iron Age II through the Hellenistic, Roman, Byzantine, early Islamic, Mamluk, and Ottoman periods. The origin of the site's name remains uncertain, with proposed etymologies linking it to either of two historical figures named Barsine or to Phoenician and Greek or Latin roots. Félix-Marie Abel identified the site with biblical Rogelim, although this identification has since been challenged.

Remains at the site include a residential quarter of interconnected rooms and courtyards with paved and mosaic floors, hearths, and silos, alongside evidence of a probable Byzantine church and a Roman-Byzantine bathhouse. Notable finds range from a 7th-century Umayyad coin and an ivory kohl stick to a Rhodian stamped amphora handle dated to the early 2nd century BC.

At the eastern edge of the site, four tombs dating to the Roman and Byzantine periods contained the remains of dozens of individuals; one, a monumental "temple tomb" mausoleum, is among only a handful of known examples of this type in the region. Isotopic and dental analysis of the skeletal remains has indicated a generally healthy, locally rooted population that relied on a self-sufficient local diet.

Barsinia first drew scholarly attention in the 19th century. A 2005 joint survey by Yarmouk University and the French Institute for the Middle East noted its importance among sites in the West Irbid area. Signs of looting prompted formal rescue excavations, first carried out in 2006 under Lamia El-Khouri of Yarmouk University's Faculty of Archaeology and Anthropology, with a further season in 2007.

== Name ==
Several etymologies have been proposed for the site's name. These include a connection with Barsine, either the eldest daughter of Darius III or the daughter of Artabazos II and wife of Mentor of Rhodes (both associated with Alexander the Great). Other suggestions derive the name from the Phoenician Bi'rsha ("sheep fountain") or from Byrsa, the Greek and Latin name meaning "bull's hide", best known as the name of the citadel of Carthage. Ancient sources also record similarly named places, including Byrsa, Bersera in Syria, and Bersima in Mesopotamia.

Félix-Marie Abel identified Barsinia with the biblical site of Rogelim (mentioned in two passages of Samuel II), suggesting that the name of the adjacent wadi, Wadi er-Rejeili (or Wadi Rugeili, but also Wadi Barsinia), preserves the biblical toponym. He also suggested that the name Barsinia may derive from Bersellei, the Greek rendering of the biblical name Barzillai the Gileadite, who is described as being from Rogelim. Nelson Glueck examined both claims. On the wadi's name, he was unable to confirm it from local residents, though he cautioned that this lack of confirmation "does not necessarily prove that the name of Wadi er-Rejeili may not exist." On the Barzillai connection, he suggested that if such a link were valid, a more likely original home for Barzillai would be the nearby Iron Age fortress of Zaharet Soq'ah. He based this on the observation that many biblical place names shifted to different sites, sometimes several kilometres away, following Hellenistic and Roman resettlement after the Iron Age. More recently, Israel Finkelstein, Ido Koch and Oded Lipschits described the identification of Barsinia with Rogelim as "far from secure".

== Description ==
Barsinia is located on a flat hill, approximately 15 kilometres (9.3 mi) west of Irbid in northern Jordan. The hill, which rises to 570 metres (1,870 ft) above sea level, lies near the village of Dayr a-Si'na and the riverbed of Wadi al-Mihwar, which separates the site from the village of Kufr 'Ana. The site, covering approximately 11,200 square metres (1.12 ha), is registered in Jordan's Antiquities Database and Information System (JADIS) as site 2221030.

Archaeological evidence indicate a largely continuous occupation during the Iron Age II, Hellenistic, Roman, Byzantine, Umayyad, Abbasid, Mamluk, and Ottoman periods. Architectural remains include rooms, plastered and paved floors, and cisterns. A probable Byzantine church is indicated by numerous tesserae, several building stones decorated with crosses, and a fragment of a marble chancel screen. A bathhouse is inferred from an associated water system and numerous roof tiles characteristic of Roman and Byzantine baths. In the late 19th century, lintels decorated with an eagle and an ox, probably belonging to a city gate on the site's eastern edge, were recorded, but these remains have since disappeared beneath a modern house. A similar decorative motif is also known from Al-Ahmadiyah in the Golan Heights.

Excavations uncovered multiple interconnected rooms and courtyards, together with a connecting passage, in the residential area. The rooms show use from the Iron Age to the early Islamic period, with finds including hearths, silos, paved and mosaic floors, iron tools, a fragment of a stamped African red-slip pottery, an ivory kohl stick, intact Hellenistic and Roman lamps, metal spoons, and an Umayyad coin dating to 695 AD. Reused architectural elements (spolia) include a Hellenistic-style ashlar incorporated into the lower courses of one wall, fragments of marble columns and slabs, and stones carved with crosses, all thought to derive from an earlier Roman or Byzantine monumental religious building.

The lowest occupation levels of a room in the residential area yielded a Rhodian stamped amphora handle, attesting to the site's connections with the wider Hellenistic world. The stamp bears three lines of Ancient Greek naming the eponym (a magistrate whose name marked the year, per Rhodian custom) Peisistratos and the Rhodian month of Diostheos, indicating that the amphora was produced during his term of office in that month. Comparison with securely dated parallel from the Ancient Agora of Athens bearing the same eponym's name dates the handle to the first half of the 2nd century BC. Two additional examples bearing the same eponym's name have been found at nearby Umm Qais.

Other finds include grinding stones, pottery, and metal tools. Glass finds include fragments, beads, and incomplete glass vessels.

=== Tombs ===
At the site's eastern edge, four Roman and Byzantine-era tombs were uncovered; they contain the skeletal remains of 37 individuals, approximately 60% of whom were adults. They were probably used by the more prosperous inhabitants of the site; the wider population was likely buried in communal pits. Tomb 1 is a shaft-entrance chamber tomb; Tomb 2 is a horizontal-entrance chamber tomb; Tomb 3 is a simple rock-cut cist grave; and Tomb 4 is a monumental built mausoleum-style tomb. Pottery and glass finds point to tomb use in the 3rd to 5th centuries AD, but architectural parallels suggest Tombs 1 and 2 originated earlier, popular regionally from the 1st to 3rd centuries AD.

Tombs 1–3 belong to the more common regional rock-cut tomb tradition, whereas Tomb 4 represents the less common "temple tomb" mausoleum type, which is also known from two parallels: the Tomb of Germanus near Jerash and a tomb at el-Quweisimeh near Amman. The tomb preserves header-and-stretcher masonry and contained the skeletal remains of 11 individuals, together with grave goods including a bronze bell, a bone borer, fragments of metal bracelets, and pottery dating from the Hellenistic to the Late Byzantine period.

A strontium isotope study examined the enamel of human third molars and rodent teeth recovered from the excavated tombs. Analysis found the adult population to have been generally healthy, with only mild pathologies such as osteophytosis, though six non-adults showed evidence of periostitis. Dental analysis found a caries rate of about 18%, comparable to other Roman and Byzantine sites in the region, along with widespread alveolar bone loss and cupped dental wear consistent with an acidic diet. Comparison of strontium isotope ratios between the human and rodent tooth enamel indicated that all twelve sampled individuals were local to the Barsinia area, with no evidence of immigration and exogamy. The low variation in the results was interpreted as evidence that the local diet was drawn from a restricted area, consistent with a self-sufficient economy.

== Research history ==
The site was visited by Edward Robinson and Eli Smith in 1842 and subsequently recorded by Gottlieb Schumacher (1890), Félix-Marie Abel (1938), Nelson Glueck (1951), and Simons (1959). Schumacher described the site as "one of the most important spots on the present Map" due to its "extensive remains". Glueck described the site as "a large, completely destroyed site,", its remains reduced to a jumble of collapsed walls and foundations spanning the Roman to medieval Islamic periods. He also noted a pillared underground cistern on the site's southern side, known locally as Bir 'Umdan, and recorded numerous dolmens on the surrounding slopes, part of a wider dolmen field.

A 2005 archaeological survey conducted jointly by Yarmouk University and the French Institute for the Middle East identified the site as one of the principal archaeological sites in the West Irbid region. Evidence of antiquities looting subsequently prompted rescue excavations. The first excavation season at the site was conducted in July 2006 by the Faculty of Archaeology and Anthropology at Yarmouk University, in cooperation with Jordan's Department of Antiquities, under the direction of Lamia El-Khouri. Another season was carried out in 2007.

== See also ==
- Decapolis
- Dental analysis in archaeology
- Isotope analysis in archaeology

== Bibliography ==
=== Sources ===
- Abd-Allah, Ramadan; El-Khouri, Lamia (2007). "In Situ Glass Conservation: A Case Study from the Archaeological Site of Barsinia, Jordan". Adumatu: A Semi-Annual Archaeological Refereed Journal on the Arab World (16): 25–36.
- Al-Shorman, Abdulla; El-Khouri, Lamia (2011). "Strontium isotope analysis of human tooth enamel from Barsinia: a late antiquity site in Northern Jordan". Archaeological and Anthropological Sciences. 3: 263–269.
- Bader, N.; El-Khouri, Lamia (2009). "A Rhodian Stamped Amphora Handle from the Site of Barsinia (North-Western Jordan)". Dirasat, Human and Social Sciences. 36: 177–182.
- El-Khouri, Lamia (2010). "Tombs of the Roman and Byzantine Periods at Bārsīnā (Northwest Jordan)". Zeitschrift des Deutschen Palästina-Vereins. 126 (2). Deutscher Verein zur Erforschung Palästinas: 131–139. JSTOR 41304084.
- El-Khouri, Lamia (2011). "Architectural Remains at Barsinya: Results of Two Seasons of Excavations (2006 and 2007)". Annual of the Department of Antiquities of Jordan. 55: 467–487.
- Finkelstein, Israel; Koch, Ido; Lipschits, Oded (2011). "The Biblical Gilead: Observations on Identifications, Geographic Divisions and Territorial History". Ugarit-Forschungen. 43: 131–159.
- Glueck, Nelson (1951). Exploration in Eastern Palestine, IV, Parts I and II. AASOR Vols. XXV-XXVIII. pp. 176–177.
- Schumacher, Gottlieb (1890). Northern Ajlun: within the Decapolis. London: PEF. pp. 127–129.

== Further information ==
- Abel, Félix-Marie. Geographie de la Palestine. Vol. II. Études Bibliques. Librairie Lecoffere. J. Gabalda et Cie, Editeurs. pp. 438–439.
