= Susa weddings =

Mass wedding arranged by Alexander the Great

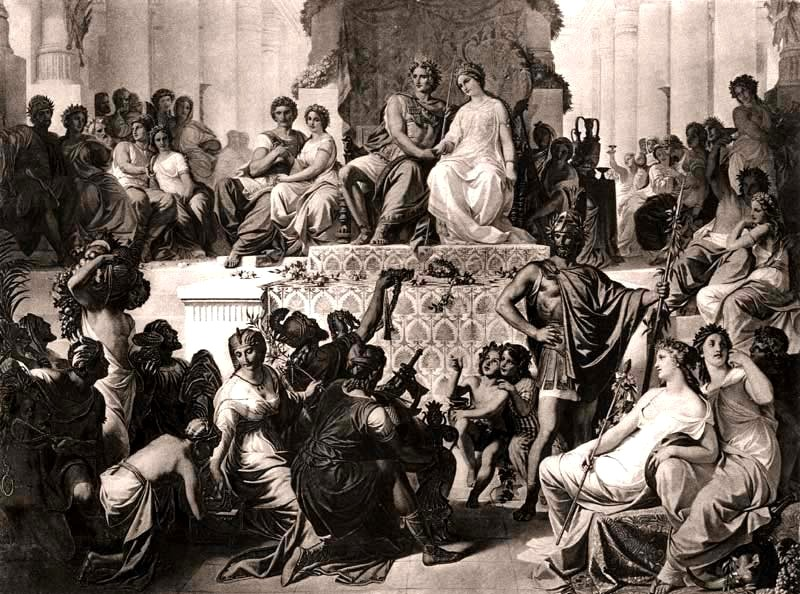
Depiction of the Susa weddings of 324 BCE: Alexander III marrying Stateira, daughter of Darius III; and Alexander's general Hephaestion marrying Stateira's sister Drypetis.

The Susa weddings were arranged by Alexander the Great in 324 BCE, shortly after he conquered the Achaemenid Empire. In an attempt to wed Greek culture with Persian culture, he and his officers held a large gathering at Susa and took Persian noblewomen as wives. The mass wedding involved 80 couples and blended various Greek and Persian traditions. Through these weddings and his own Persian wife, Alexander intended to legitimize his rule over Persia and solidify his claim as the successor of the Achaemenid dynasty. It was also expected that any children produced from these marriages would, as the product of both Greek and Persian blood, serve as a symbol of the two civilizations coming together under Alexander's Macedonian Empire.

== Purpose ==
Alexander intended to symbolically unite the Persian and Greek cultures, by taking a Persian wife himself and celebrating a mass wedding with Persian ceremony along with his officers, for whom he arranged marriages with noble Persian wives. The union was not merely symbolic, as their prospective offspring were intended to be the inheritors of both civilizations.

By marrying the daughters of Darius and Artaxerxes, Alexander was both identifying himself with the Persians and also making his own position more secure. He could now claim to be the son and rightful heir of both previous Persian kings. He also wanted to honour Hephaestion by making him his brother-in-law.

== Arrangement of the spouses ==
Alexander was already married to Roxana, the daughter of a Bactrian chief, but Macedonian and Persian customs allowed several wives. Alexander himself married Stateira (sometimes called Barsine, but not to be confused with Barsine, wife of Memnon), the eldest daughter of Darius, and, according to Aristobulus, another wife in addition, Parysatis, the youngest daughter of Artaxerxes III. To Hephaestion he gave Drypetis; she too was the daughter of Darius, his own wife's sister, for he wanted Hephaestion's children to be his own nephews and nieces (This can also be linked to Alexander and Hephaestion's close relationship). To Seleucus he gave Apama, the daughter of Spitamenes the Sogdian warlord, and likewise to the other Companions the daughters of the most notable Medes and Persians, eighty in all. Ptolemy I Soter married Artakama, daughter of Artabazus of Phrygia.

=== Order of precedence ===
The weddings were solemnized in the Persian fashion: chairs were placed for the bridegrooms in order of precedence; after the toasts the brides entered and sat down each by her groom, who took them by the hand and kissed them. The king was the first to be married, for all the weddings were celebrated in the same manner, and in this ceremony, he showed even more than his customary approachability and comradeship.

The bridegrooms after receiving their brides led them away, each to his own home, and to all Alexander gave a dowry. And as for all the Macedonians who had already married Asian women, Alexander ordered a list of their names to be drawn up; they numbered over 10,000, and Alexander offered them all gifts their wedding

— Arrian

== Aftermath ==
Traditionally, historians suggested that the Macedonians thought poorly of the Susa marriages, seemingly evidenced by many officers divorcing their Persian wives after Alexander's death. However, Branko F. van Oppen de Ruiter explains that this affirmation is unfounded and that not a single ancient source makes such claim. Similarly, historian A. B. Bosworth stated that there exists no evidence of the Macedonians strongly opposing the unions. Historian Elizabeth Baynham further pointed out that officers like Seleucus, Nearchus, and Eumenes maintained their marriages, even using their new family connections for political benefit. The fate of other wives remains simply unknown, and some divorcees like Craterus and Amastris parted amicably out of mutual political considerations.

== See also ==
- Ariston (actor)

== Works cited ==
- Baynham, Elizabeth (2022). "Bosworth on Alexander and the Iranians Revisted: Alexander's Marriages to Persian Brides at Susa: A Study of Arrian, Anabasis 7.4.4-8". In Frances Pownall; Sulochana R. Asirvatham; Sabine Müller (eds.). The Courts of Philip II and Alexander the Great: Monarchy and Power in Ancient Macedonia. Walter de Gruyter. p. 149–168. ISBN 978-3-11-062240-9.
