= The Ends of the Earth (novel) =

1998 book by Valerio Massimo Manfredi

- Front cover of the book
- Author: Valerio Massimo Manfredi
- Translator: Iain Halliday
- Language: Italian
- Series: Alexander Trilogy
- Genre: Historical Novel
- Publisher: Mondadori (Italy); Pan Books (UK)
- Publication date: 1998
- Publication place: Italy
- Media type: Print (Paperback)
- Pages: 577 pp
- ISBN: 978-0-333-90695-8 (UK)
- Preceded by: The Sands of Ammon

The Ends of the Earth (original title: Il confine del Mondo) is the third and last part of Valerio Massimo Manfredi's trilogy on Alexander the Great. After the Oracle of Ammon told him he is the son of Zeus, Alexander feels invincible and marches north towards the historic town of Babylon. The beautiful city is ravaged and the Palace of Persepolis, the former residence of King Darius, is burnt to ashes together with the memories of the old Empire. It is now time to start anew, and Alexander decides on yet another hard task: unify the Persian people with the Macedonians. As he struggles to convince his countrymen to come to cultural compromises with the Persians, he falls in love with Queen Roxane. And it is this love that gives him the strength to fulfil his epic destiny.

== Plot ==
When the Oracle of Ammon tells Alexander that he is the son of Zeus, the young Macedonian king finds even more inner strength and will to conquer new lands and rule the biggest Empire ever known. His army then crosses the Tigris and the Euphrates to reach Babylon, which is then raged by the Macedonians. The palace of Persepolis, the most beautiful palace in the world, is burnt to ashes by Alexander himself. This marks the end of Darius III's Persian Empire and the beginning of Alexander's.

The Macedonian King, Pharaoh of Egypt and Great King of Persia is now also Great Leader by the Pan-Hellenic League and he aims for India and Arabia to expand his Empire even further. His army seems unstoppable and unbeatable, driven forward by a man that defies human capabilities. Yet, when he tries to make his dream of a great unite Empire between Macedonians and Persians reality, his army starts to doubt his ideals and to critique his way of adapting to Persian customs at court. As his companions slowly yet gradually wonder about their king's choices, Alexander's life gets a sorrowful turn. He loses his wife Barsine, his loved horse Bucephalus, his best friend Hephaestion and his tutor Leonidas in the most brutal of ways. Even his own life is now in danger, with some of his warriors planning to kill him twice. He has to execute the warriors who planned for his assassination as well as a friend of his that had heard of the plan but did not inform him. This torments him, but he knows he does not have choice.

He finds refuge in the Iliad and other poems, where in the past he found sources of inspiration for battle tactics. He stops eating food and falls ill, and the only thing that gives him strength to go on and chase his immense dream is love. He meets and falls in love with Queen Roxane, who also gives the great gift of becoming father of a son. He is also named Alexander.

He then tries to push forward towards India, as conquering it would mean that the whole of Asia would be in his hands, but he feels that his warriors' homesickness gets too much to bear. Fearing the prospect of facing other large armies and exhausted by years of campaigning, Alexander's army mutinies at the Hyphasis River, refusing to march farther east. Alexander tried to persuade his soldiers to march farther, but his general Coenus pleads with him to change his opinion and turn back. Alexander then has to march backwards towards the now far Macedonia and, during this very last part of his journey, he falls ill again. His friends become worried about his deteriorating conditions, and it seems nothing can save him. During the last few days of his life, unable to walk, he lets every one of his warriors walk into his tent for a last farewell. This gives the opportunity to the sorrowful Macedonian soldiers to pay their tribute to their epic and heroic king.

== Characters ==
- Alexander - the prince and later the King of Macedon.
- Philip II of Macedon - The King of Macedon and Alexander's father.
- Olympias - The Queen and Alexander's mother.
- Cleopatra - Alexander's sister.
- Darius III - The Persian king.
- Roxane - Alexander's last wife.
- Hephaestion - Alexander's best friend and Macedonian general.
- Ptolemy - Alexander's friend and Macedonian general.
- Seleucus - Alexander's friend and Macedonian officer.
- Leonnatus - Alexander's friend and Macedonian officer.
- Lysimachus - Alexander's friend and Macedonian officer.
- Craterus - Alexander's friend and Macedonian general.
- Perdiccas - Alexander's friend and Macedonian general.
- Philotas - Alexander's friend and most experienced and talented general, Parmenion's son.
- Leonidas - Alexander's tutor until the age of 13.
- Aristotle - Alexander's tutor in Mieza.
- Parmenion - Alexander and Philip's general, Philotas's father.
- Cleitus the Black - Officer of Alexander's and Philip's army.
- Antipater - General of Alexander's and Philip's army.
- Barsine - Memnon's beautiful wife.
- Leptine - The girl Alexander rescued.

== Poem ==
You can read here the first part and the second part of the poem.

Only destiny denies me now the final frontier

The waves of the motionless Ocean.
It would have been better to pursue
The dream that fires the soul
As the sun illuminates the forests at sunset,

The dream, the infinite shadow of the Real.

== See also ==
- Child of a Dream
- The Sands of Ammon
- Valerio Massimo Manfredi
- Alexander the Great
- Philip II of Macedon
