= 329 BC =

329 BC in various calendars
- Gregorian calendar: 329 BC; CCCXXIX BC
- Ab urbe condita: 425
- Ancient Egypt era: XXXII dynasty, 4
- Pharaoh: Alexander the Great, 4
- Ancient Greek Olympiad (summer): 112th Olympiad, year 4
- Assyrian calendar: 4422
- Balinese saka calendar: N/A
- Bengali calendar: −922 – −921
- Berber calendar: 622
- Buddhist calendar: 216
- Burmese calendar: −966
- Byzantine calendar: 5180–5181
- Chinese calendar: 辛卯年 (Metal Rabbit); 2369 or 2162 — to — 壬辰年 (Water Dragon); 2370 or 2163
- Coptic calendar: −612 – −611
- Discordian calendar: 838
- Ethiopian calendar: −336 – −335
- Hebrew calendar: 3432–3433
- Hindu calendars
- Vikram Samvat: −272 – −271
- Shaka Samvat: N/A
- Kali Yuga: 2772–2773
- Holocene calendar: 9672
- Iranian calendar: 950 BP – 949 BP
- Islamic calendar: 979 BH – 978 BH
- Javanese calendar: N/A
- Julian calendar: N/A
- Korean calendar: 2005
- Minguo calendar: 2240 before ROC 民前2240年
- Nanakshahi calendar: −1796
- Thai solar calendar: 214–215
- Tibetan calendar: ལྕགས་མོ་ཡོས་ལོ་ (female Iron-Hare) −202 or −583 or −1355 — to — ཆུ་ཕོ་འབྲུག་ལོ་ (male Water-Dragon) −201 or −582 or −1354

Year 329 BCE was a year of the pre-Julian Roman calendar. At the time, it was known as the Year of the Consulship of Privernas and Decianus (or, less frequently, year 425 Ab urbe condita). The denomination 329 BC for this year has been used since the early medieval period, when the Anno Domini calendar era became the prevalent method in Europe for naming years.

== Events ==
=== By place ===
==== Macedonian Empire ====
- From Phrada, Alexander the Great presses on up the valley of the Helmand River, through Arachosia, and over the mountains past the site of modern Kabul into the country of the Paropamisade, where he founds Alexandria by the Caucasus.
- In Bactria, Bessus raises a national revolt in the eastern satrapies using the title of King Artaxerxes V of Persia.
- Crossing the Hindu Kush northward, probably over the Khawak Pass, Alexander brings his army, despite food shortages, to Drapsaka. Outflanked, Bessus flees beyond the Oxus river.
- Marching west to Bactra (Zariaspa), Alexander appoints Artabazus of Phrygia as the satrap of Bactria.
- Crossing the Oxus, Alexander sends his general Ptolemy in pursuit of Bessus. In the meantime, Bessus is overthrown by the Sogdian Spitamenes. Bessus is captured, flogged, and sent to Ptolemy in Bactria with the hope of appeasing Alexander. In due course, Bessus is publicly executed at Ecbatana. With the death of Bessus (Artaxerxes V), Persian resistance to Alexander the Great ceases.
- From Maracanda, Alexander advances through Cyropolis to the Jaxartes river, the boundary of the Persian Empire. There he breaks the opposition of the Scythian nomads by his use of catapults and, after defeating them in a battle on the north bank of the river, pursues them into the interior. On the site of modern Khujand on the Jaxartes, he founds a city, Alexandria Eschate, "the farthest."
- Macedonian expeditionary corps in Central Asia is defeated in the Battle of the Polytimetus.

== Deaths ==
- Bessus (Artaxerxes V), Persian nobleman and satrap of Bactria, and later the last claimant to the Achaemenid throne of Persia
