= Transcontinental royal intermarriage =

Practice of ruling dynasties of different continents marrying into each other

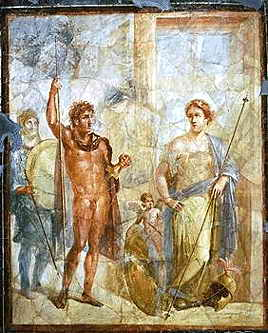
Alexander the Great and his second wife, the Persian noblewoman Stateira

Transcontinental royal intermarriages is royal intermarriage between royal families originating from different continents. One of the best-known instances of transcontinental royal intermarriage is the one between Alexander the Great, king of Macedon, and his three wives, Roxana, Stateira and Parysatis.

== Ancient Macedonia ==
=== Alexander the Great and the Susa weddings ===
in 327 BC, during his conquest of the Achaemenid Empire, Alexander the Great fell in love with Roxana, daughter of the Bactrian nobleman Oxyartes, and married her despite his companions' opposition. Roxana later gave birth to a son after Alexander's death, Alexander IV of Macedon.

After Alexander defeated Darius III at the Battle of Issus, he captured his family, including his daughter Stateira. In 324 BC, during a mass wedding known as the Susa weddings, Alexander married both Stateira and her cousin Parysatis, members of the Achaemenid dynasty. Other notable marriages that occurred during the Susa weddings are the one between Selecus I and the Sogdian noble Apama and the one between Ptolemy I and the Persian noble Artakama

== Byzantine Empire ==
=== Khazarian dynasties ===
In 695, the Byzantine emperor Justinian II was deposed and exiled to Crimea. In 703, he escaped and received help by Busir, khagan of Khazaria, who offered him his sister's hand. Justinian accepted and renamed her Theodora, probably after the wife of Justinian I. The couple had one son, co-emperor Tiberius IV.

Around 732, to solidify an alliance with Khazaria, the future emperor Constantine V married Tzitzak, daughter of khagan Bihar. Tzitzak was later renamed "Irene". The marriage produced Byzantine emperor Leo IV, who was given the epithet "the Khazar" referencing his maternal descent.

=== Armenia and Georgia ===
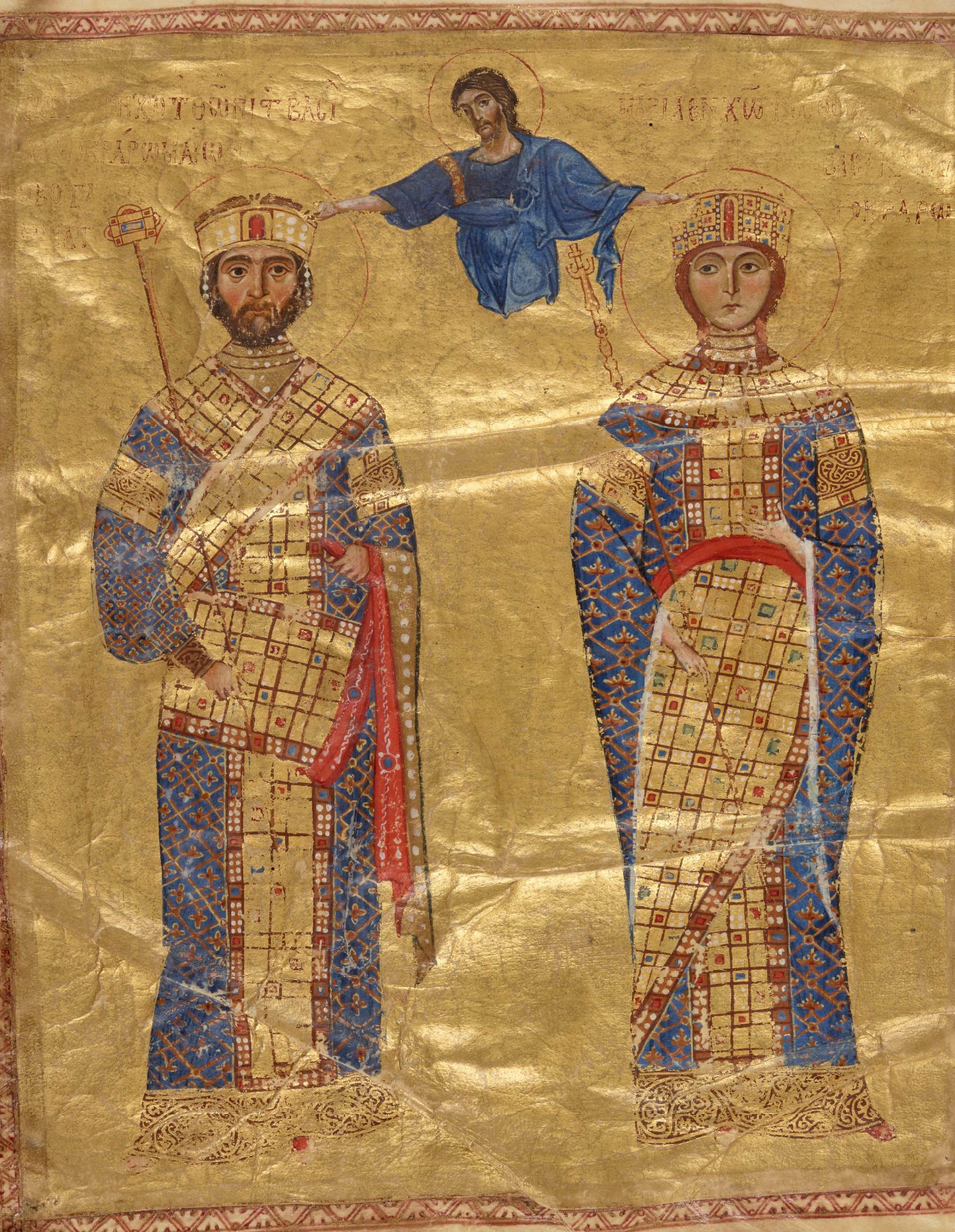
Emperor Nikephoros III and his wife Maria of Alania

Due to the closeness of the empire with the two realms, Byzantine royals often married with Armenian and Georgian dynasties. Here follows a list of documented marriages:

- Emperor Michael VII and Maria of Alania.
- Emperor Nikephoros III and Maria of Alania.
- Hovhannes-Smbat III of Armenia and an Argyra (niece of emperor Romanos III)
- Constantine I of Armenia and Pokhaina (relative of emperor Nikephoros II Phokas)
- Theodore I of Nicaea and Philippa of Armenia.
- David VI of Georgia and Theodora Doukaina Palaeologina (daughter of emperor Michael VIII).
- Emperor Michael IX and Rita of Armenia.
- Demetrius II of Georgia and Megale Komnena (daughter of Manuel I of Trebizond).
- Bagrat V of Georgia and Helene of Trebizond.
- Bagrat V of Georgia and Anna of Trebizond.

=== Mongol khanates ===
Around 1265, Byzantine Emperor Michael VIII attempted to start diplomatic relationships with the Mongol Ilkhanate. A marriage was combined between Ilkhan Hulagu, and Michael's illegitimate daughter, Maria Palaiologina. Maria left Costantinople in 1265, but when she arrived in Caesarea she was informed that Hulagu had died, so it was decided for her to marry Hulagu's son, Abaqa. The Mongols called Maria "Despina Khatun". The marriage produced a daughter, Theodora Ara Qutlugh.

Michael VIII also tried to form an alliance with the Golden Horde. In 1266, he gave another illegitimate daughter, Euphrosyne Palaiologina, in marriage to the khan Nogai. There are no known children resulting from this marriage.

== England ==
=== Failed alliance with the Ayyubids ===
In a negotiation between Richard the Lionheart and Saladin during the third crusade, it was proposed to arrange a marriage between al-Adil, Saladin's brother, and either Richard's sister Joan or his niece Eleanor. The arrangement however failed for religious reasons.

== Hungary ==
=== Cumania ===
Around 1238, Béla IV of Hungary arranged a marriage between his son, future Stephen V, and Elizabeth, the daughter of a Cuman leader whom he had invited to settle in the plains along the river Tisza. This leader is either khan Köten or a man named Seyhan. The marriage resulted in 4 daughters and 2 sons, among whom there is Laudislaus IV, who succeeded his father, and who was nicknamed "the Cuman" for his mother's origins.

== Russia ==
=== Mongol khanates ===
In 1315, Yury, prince of Moscow, sealed an alliance with khan Uzbeg of the Golden Horde by marrying his sister Konchaka. Konchaka then converted to orthodoxy and was renamed "Agafiia". She was imprisoned in a war to take the principality of Vladimir and died before she could give Yury any sons.

== Georgia ==
=== Europe ===
After the annexation of Georgia by the Russian Empire, the Georgians gradually entered into the Western cultural sphere. This came following centuries of staying within the Persian cultural sphere and multiple intermarriages with the Mongols, the Shirvanshahs, the Seljuks, and the Safavid and Afsharid dynasties of Persia. Although the Bagrationi Dynasty lost its royal dignity and became subsumed into the Russian nobility, they were nonetheless still able to achieve several marriages with reigning or fellow previously-reigning royal houses from Europe. There are inconsistent and conflicting designations of such unions as dynastic or morganatic. Here is a short list of such marriages:

- Konstantine Bagration of Mukhrani and Princess Tatiana Constantinovna of Russia
- Leonida Bagration of Mukhrani and Grand Duke Vladimir Kirillovich of Russia
- Irakli Bagration of Mukhrani and Infanta María de las Mercedes of Spain
