= Battle of the Polytimetus =

329 BCE Macedonian defeat in Central Asia

- Part of wars of Alexander the Great
Date	329 BC
Location	Polytimetus River, Central Asia
Result	Sogdian–Scythian victory

Belligerents
Kingdom of Macedonia	Sogdians and Scythians

Commanders and leaders
Andromachus †; Caranus †; Menedemus †; Pharnuches †	Spitamenes

Strength
c. 2360	unknown

Casualties and losses
c. 2020–2300	unknown

The Battle of the Polytimetus was fought in 329 BC between Macedonian expeditionary corps and joint Sogdian–Scythian forces at the Polytimetus (modern Zarafshon River) in Central Asia. The Macedonian corps was defeated, with its four commanders dispatched by Alexander the Great being killed. Although Alexander did not lead the battle personally, modern authors attribute the defeat particularly to his mistaken decision to put an inexperienced person, Pharnuches, among the corps' commanders. The corps' casualties were unprecedented, but the damage to the core Macedonian army of Alexander was minimal and the loss of its mercenaries was compensated by 328 BC.

== Background ==
In the summer of 329 BC Alexander learned of the revolt of warlord Spitamenes, who besieged Alexander's garrison in Maracanda (modern Samarkand). Alexander ordered his commanders Andromachus, Caranus and Menedemus to aid the garrison with 60 Companion cavalrymen, 800 mounted mercenaries and 1,500 infantry mercenaries (according to Curtius Rufus, it consisted of 3000 infantrymen and 800 cavalrymen, but this is possibly an exaggeration). At the same time Alexander gave Pharnuches, an interpreter, large authority over the corps, indicating both military and diplomatic effort. The Macedonian corps managed to reclaim Maracanda and expel Spitamenes who retreated to Sogdia. The corps then decided to pursue Spitamenes and expel him from Sogdia. Based on ancient authors, it is believed that Spitamenes ended his retreat near modern Otrar or Türkmenabat.

== Battle ==
According to Arrian, while in pursuit of Spitamenes, Macedonians needlessly attacked the Scythian nomads. Having exploited this, Spitamenes reinforced his troops with 600 Scythian horsemen. He positioned the forces at the edge of the "Scythian desert" which is interpreted as Kyzylkum Desert. According to Arrian, Spitamenes did not want to wait for the Macedonians or to attack them himself, instead he chose to harass them. His mounted archers started to circle around the Macedonians, showering them with arrows, while dodging direct engagement. Unlike Spitamenes' horses, Macedonian cavalry commanded by Andromachus and Caranus was exhausted due to long journey and insufficient forage. As Macedonians casualties climbed up, it was decided to move in a square formation to the forested area of the Polytimetus to take cover from enemy archers. Caranus, without informing Andromachus, crossed the river to place his cavalry under forest cover, followed by infantry. At the crossing Macedonians were encircled, their remnants retreated to a small river islet where they were further encircled and killed. The few captured Macedonians were also killed. Only around 300 infantrymen and 40 cavalrymen survived.

The battle was described as "essentially the dark mirror image of Alexander's brilliant victory on the Syr Darya" and "a case of Central Asian tactics not just beating Alexander's army, but humiliating it". The Macedonian defeat is attributed to inexperienced leadership, limited resources of the corps and its unbalanced composition, with the prevalence of heavy infantry and heavy cavalry.

== Aftermath ==
By the winter of 329/328 BC, the mercenary losses were offset by bringing reinforcements from the western part of Alexander's empire. Antipater, in particular, sent at least 8,000 Greeks, including 500 cavalrymen. Alexander himself tried to prevent the deterioration of general strategic situation in Sogdia due to corps' loss. Those who survived the defeat were prohibited to spread the news under punishment of death. According to ancient authors, Alexander, while chasing Spitamenes, arrived at the battlefield and buried the dead. He then unleashed a retribution, devastating the Polytimetus valley and killing a large number of locals. Spitamenes was ultimately defeated by Alexander's general Coenus and treacherously assassinated after a retreat.

After the Polytimetus defeat Alexander started to form his expeditionary corps only from well-prepared and disciplined units under seasoned commanders, like Coenus, Craterus, Perdiccas and Ptolemy. He started to use expeditionary corps more frequently in his Central Asian and Indian campaigns, having stopped to entrust mercenaries with important tasks.
