= The Sands of Ammon =

- Front cover of the book
- Author: Valerio Massimo Manfredi
- Translator: Iain Halliday
- Language: Italian
- Series: Alexander Trilogy
- Genre: Historical Novel
- Publisher: Mondadori (Italy); Pan Books (UK)
- Publication date: 1998
- Publication place: Italy
- Media type: Print paperback
- Pages: 418 pp
- Preceded by: Child of a Dream
- Followed by: The Ends of the Earth

The Sands of Ammon (original title: Le Sabbie di Amon) is the second part of Valerio Massimo Manfredi's Alexander trilogy, following on from Child of a Dream. Continuing the epic story of Alexander the Great, The Sands of Ammon narrates of the Macedonian king's quest to conquer Asia. He and his men storm and conquer Persian towns and harbours; even the legendary town of Halicarnassus is defeated. Alexander's army marches on to the snow-covered Anatolia, where it records yet another few victories. Despite defeating the king Darius III, the city of Tyre and the Towers of Gaza prove to be formidable enemies, although they ultimately have to surrender to Alexander. The Macedonian army then heads south towards the mysterious and epic land of Egypt; and it's here, in the sands of the endless Libyan Desert, that the Oracle of Ammon lies. And what the divine Oracle will reveal to Alexander will change his life forever.

== Plot ==
After the victory in Thessaly which ended the first book of the trilogy, Child of a Dream, Alexander and his army march towards the East. The first step of the expedition is to free the Greek cities from the Persian domination in order to establish a strong and united Pan-Hellenic League. Once that is achieved, the target is the Persian Empire itself and its immense Asian territory.

During his military campaign the Macedonian army records numerous victories, including those against the city of Tyre, the Towers of Giza and the legendary Halicarnassus. And it is in the midst of this campaign that Alexander meets the only opponent he believes worthy of his utmost respect: Memnon of Rhodes, the commander of the Greek mercenaries of the Persian army. He struggles in the attempt to defeat Memnon fair and square on the field, but the two end up stalemating each other with strategic cunning. Alexander's friends then suggest to end the confrontation between the two men by ordering to poison the mercenary; Alexander is however disgusted by this outrageous idea as he reckons his opponent is worthy of being defeated with respect and the only way for that to be possible is for Alexander to beat him on the battle field. However, Alexander's friends do carry out the order without Alexander's approval or knowing and Memnon is poisoned within a few weeks. The mercenary's death represents an anticlimactic end to the fantastic strategic battle between the two.

After Memnon's death, Alexander claims his former wife: the beautiful Barsine. The two grow close, which makes Leptine jealous of their relationship. After the Macedonian army finally defeats Darius, thank to a tactically perfect charge, Alexander becomes the sovereign of the greatest Empire that ever existed. Darius offers terms of unconditional surrender, but Alexander, realizing his position, rejects Darius's initial offer. Darius is thus forced to come back, offering all his territory as far as the Euphrates and a huge ransom. The surrounding nations, seeing Alexander's ruthlessness in victory, fear a similar defeat, and some of their leaders choose to abdicate power to Alexander rather than face him in battle. But the young king is certainly not satisfied: he heads towards Egypt and, after defeating the Tyrian naval force that was attempting to block his way into the country, he finally makes it to the land of the Pharaohs. Here, he is proclaimed Pharaoh and he founds the first of his cities: Alexandria.

Finally, he crosses the Libyan Desert and after a long and hard journey, he reaches the Oasis of Siwa, where the Oracle of Ammon lies. This tells him that he is not a mere human, but the son of Zeus himself.

== Characters ==
- Alexander - the Prince and later the King of Macedon.
- Philip II of Macedon - The King of Macedon and Alexander's father.
- Olympias - The Queen and Alexander's mother.
- Cleopatra - Alexander's sister.
- Darius III - The Persian king.
- Memnon of Rhodes - The commander of the Greek mercenaries of King Darius's army and the formidable Alexander's enemy.
- Hephaestion - Alexander's best friend and Macedonian general.
- Ptolemy - Alexander's friend and Macedonian general.
- Seleucus - Alexander's friend and Macedonian officer.
- Leonnatus - Alexander's friend and Macedonian officer.
- Lysimachus - Alexander's friend and Macedonian officer.
- Craterus - Alexander's friend and Macedonian general.
- Perdiccas - Alexander's friend and Macedonian general.
- Philotas - Alexander's friend and most experienced and talented general, Parmenion's son.
- Leonidas - Alexander's tutor until the age of 13.
- Aristotle - Alexander's tutor in Mieza.
- Parmenion - Alexander and Philip's general, Philotas's father.
- Cleitus the Black - Officer of Alexander's and Philip's army.
- Antipater - General of Alexander's and Philip's army.
- Barsine - Memnon's beautiful wife.
- Leptine - The girl Alexander rescued.

== Reception ==
Publishers Weekly said that "the style tends to be somewhat generic", and was disappointed to find that the author "gloss[es] over many of the personality foibles that led to Alexander's downfall".

== Poem ==
For the first part of the poem, click here.

"Who bloodied the

Star of the Argeads?
Who killed my Father?"
"Your Father?
O young, glorious and invincible one,

I am your Father!"

== See also ==
- Child of a Dream
- The Ends of the Earth
- Valerio Massimo Manfredi
- Alexander the Great
- Philip II of Macedon
- Ammon
- Zeus
