= Caranus (hetairos) =

Macedonian general (d. 329 BCE)

Caranus (Greek: Κάρανος; died 329 BC), a Macedonian member of the elite cavalry body known as the hetairoi (Greek:ἑταῖροι), was one of the generals sent by Alexander the Great against Satibarzanes when, for a second time, he had encouraged Aria to revolt. Caranus and his colleagues were successful in achieving their objective by defeating and slaying Satibarzanes in the winter of 330 BC.

In 329 BC, Caranus was appointed, together with Andromachus and Menedemus, under the command of the Lycian Pharnuches, to act against Spitamenes, the revolted satrap of Sogdiana. Their approach compelled him to raise the siege of Maracanda; but, in a battle which ensued, he defeated them with the help of a body of Scythian cavalry, and forced them to fall back on the river Polytimetus, the wooded banks of which promised shelter. The rashness however or cowardice of Caranus led him to attempt the passage of the river with the cavalry under his command, and the rest of the troops plunging in after him in haste and disorder, they were all destroyed by the enemy.
