= Glaucias of Macedon =

Ancient Macedonian general

Glaucias of Macedon (Ancient Greek: Γλαυκίας) was an officer of the Companion cavalry at the Battle of Gaugamela. He may be the Glaucias who, on Cassander's orders, murdered Alexander IV of Macedon and his mother Roxana in the citadel of Amphipolis.

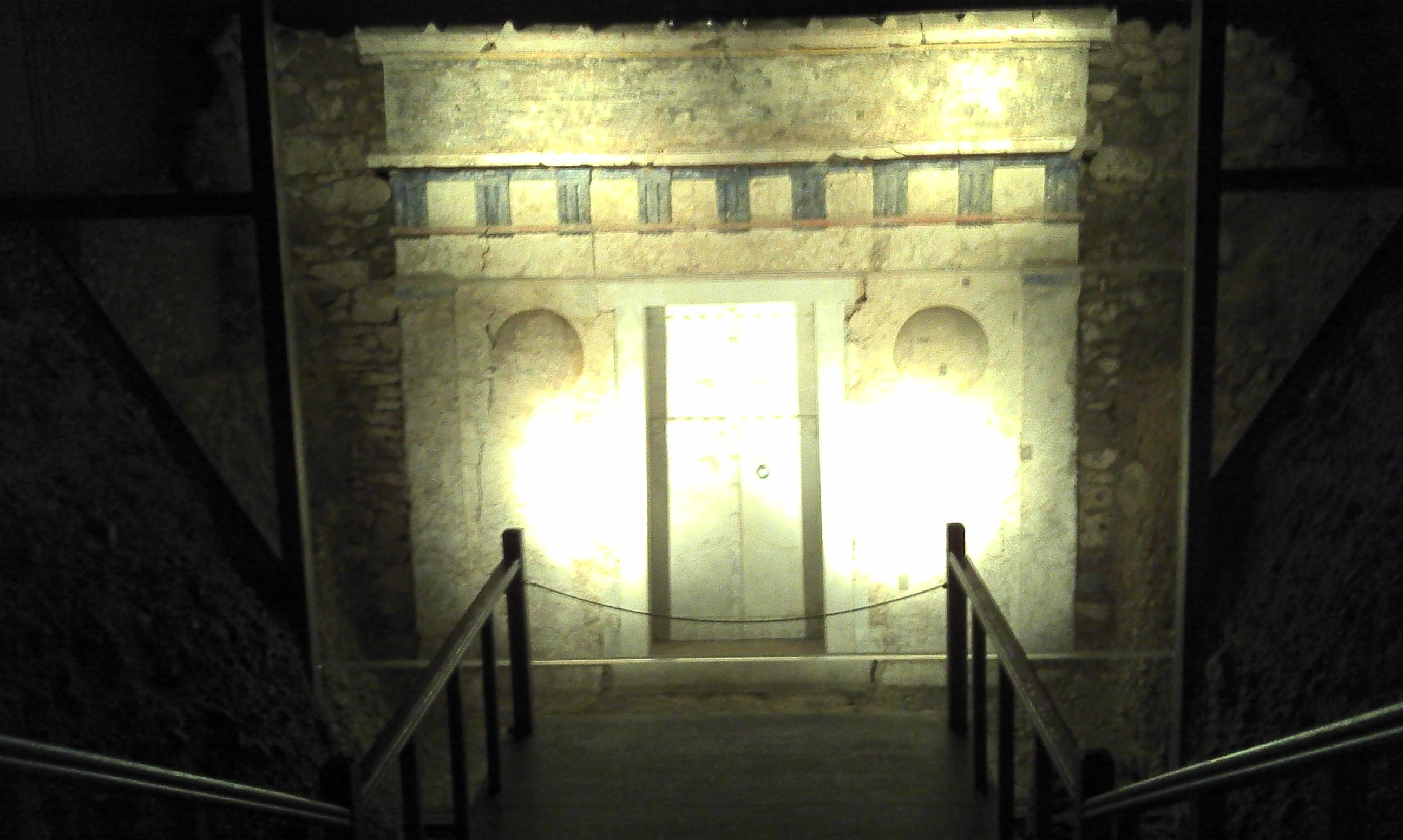
Tomb III in Vergina, which probably belonged to Alexander IV

Defenders of the Argead dynasty began to declare that Alexander IV, at the age of 14, should now rule on his own and that a regent was no longer needed. Cassander realized that to secure his rule Alexander would need to be removed, and in 309 BC he commanded Glaucias to assassinate Alexander IV and his mother. The orders were carried out, and they were both poisoned. The consensus in A History of Macedonia Vol. 3 is that Alexander was killed late in the summer of 309 BC, shortly after his alleged half-brother Heracles.

One of the royal tombs discovered by the archaeologist Manolis Andronikos in the so-called "Great Tumulus" in Vergina in 1977–78 is believed to belong to Alexander IV.

== See also ==
- Ariston of Macedon
