= Artakama =

Wife of Ptolemy I Soter

Artakama or Artacama (Ancient Greek: Ἀρτακάμα; fl. 324 BC) was a Persian noblewoman and the second wife of Ptolemy I Soter, a Macedonian general under Alexander the Great and the first Pharaoh of the Ptolemaic dynasty of Egypt.

== Biography ==
Artakama (or as Plutarch calls her Apama Eum. 18.1) was a daughter of Artabazus of Phrygia, a grandson of king Artaxerxes II and queen Strateira. Her father was a Satrap of Dascylium under Artaxerxes III and Darius III, and a Satrap of Bactria under Alexander. Her mother was most likely the only known wife of Artabazus, an anonymous sister of the Rhodian generals Memnon and Mentor, who were in Persian service in the late 340 BCs and the 330 BCs.

Artakama married Ptolemy (then a general) in April 324 BC at a marriage festival in the city of Susa, as ordered by Alexander the Great. Many of the Macedonian and other Greek officers took Persian wives shortly afterward. Artakama was not mentioned in historical texts again, probably because Ptolemy quietly discarded her when he left Babylon for Egypt after Alexander's death. If so, his action was a contrast to that of his friend Seleucus, whose Persian wife, Apama, married also on that occasion, remained with him permanently. Seleucus and Apama became the ancestors of the kings of the Seleucid dynasty and, through a future dynastic marriage, of the last rulers of the Ptolemaic dynasty. Artakama is called Apama by Plutarch, but this is likely an error.

Ptolemy had no known children by Artakama.

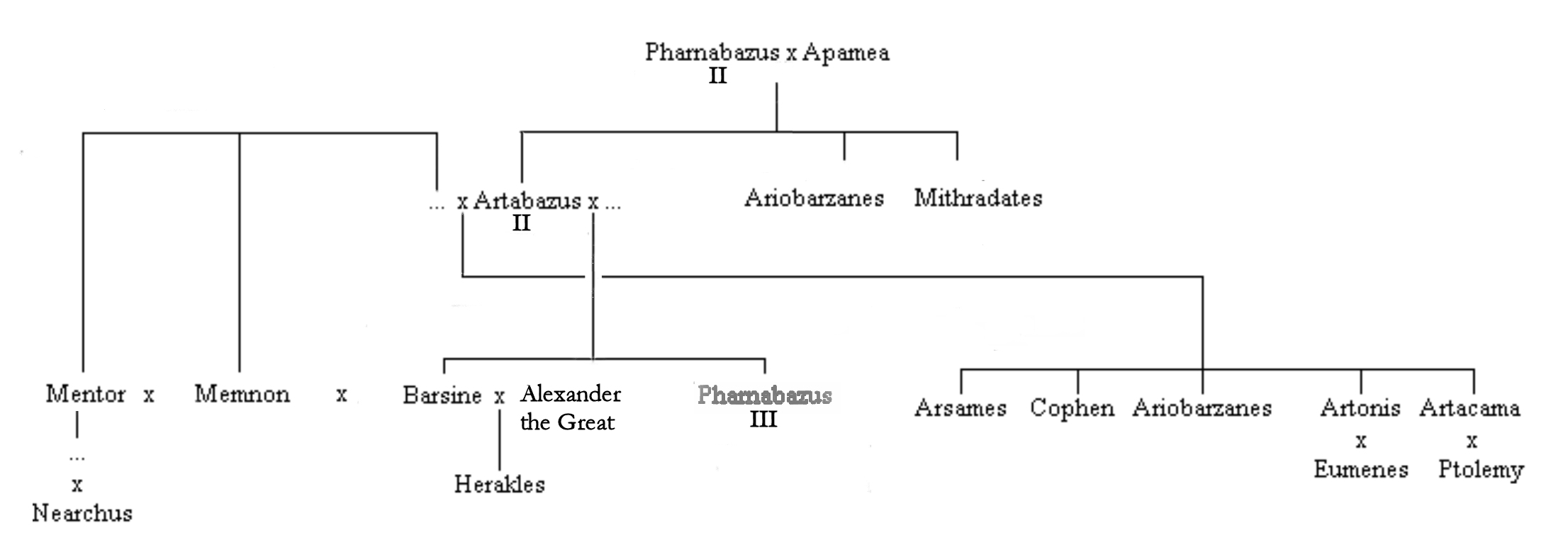
Family tree of the later Pharnacids. Artakama was daughter of Artabazos II of Phrygia.
