= Sopolis of Macedon =

Sopolis (Ancient Greek: Σώπολις), son of Hermodorus, was hipparch of the ile of Hetairoi from Amphipolis, since at least the Triballian campaign of Alexander the Great 335 BC. That he belonged to the Macedonian aristocracy is indicated not only by his important cavalry command but also by the fact that his son, Hermolaus, served as one of Alexander's Pages in 327 BC.

== See also ==
- Ariston of Macedon
