= Child of a Dream =

1998 novel by Valerio Massimo Manfredi

- Front cover of the book
- Author: Valerio Massimo Manfredi
- Translator: Iain Halliday
- Language: Italian
- Series: Alexander Trilogy
- Genre: Historical Novel
- Publisher: Mondadori (Italy); Pan Books (UK)
- Publication date: 1998
- Publication place: Italy
- Media type: Print paperback
- Pages: 434 pp
- ISBN: 978-0-330-39988-3 (UK)
- Followed by: The Sands of Ammon

Child of a Dream (original title: Il figlio del sogno) is a historical novel, the first part of Valerio Massimo Manfredi's Alexander trilogy, released in 1998. It narrates the childhood of Alexander the Great, son of King Philip II of Macedon and Queen Olympias, including his tutelage under the Greek philosopher Aristotle. It also focuses on Alexander's friendship with Hephaestion and Ptolemy, and his preparation to become a warrior able to lead the Macedonian Empire.

== Plot ==
The story starts before the birth of Alexander at Pella, when his mother Queen Olympias dreams of a snake slithering inside her bed and thrusting its seed inside her; when she recounts her dream to the priests of the Oracle of Dodona, they tell her that her child shall be the offspring of Zeus and a man, just like his hero Achilles. On the day that Alexander was born, his father Philip was preparing a siege on the city of Potidea on the peninsula of Chalcidice. That same day, Philip received news that his general Parmenion had defeated the combined Illyrian and Paeonian armies, and that his horses had won at the Olympic Games. It would later come to be said that on this day the Temple of Artemis in Ephesus, one of the Seven Wonders of the World, burnt down because Artemis was away, attending the birth of Alexander.

During his childhood, Alexander and his friends Hephaestion, Ptolemy, Seleucus, Leonnatus, Lysimachus, Craterus, Perdiccas and Philotas, are firstly educated by Leonidas. He teaches them the values of courage and pride, but also magnanimity; this would prove very important to Alexander during his campaigns. When Alexander is 13 years old, his father decides to send him (and his friends with him) to Mieza, a nearby town, for him to be tutored by Aristotle. The great philosopher teaches Alexander and his friends all the latest notions of science, philosophy, and literature. Leptine, a girl that Alexander himself had saved from slavery, also joins the boys in Mieza; she will also stay very close to Alexander until his death.

When back in his hometown Pella, Alexander manages to tame a wild war horse at his first attempt. He calls his horse Bucephalus, and grows fond of him. So much so that the two share an almost human friendship. Finally, Alexander is old enough to go to war with his father's army in Cheronea, where they are victorious.

Alexander greatly admires his father and his military achievements. He is also very close to his sister, Cleopatra, and to his mother. However, when Philip marries Eurydice Alexander grows harsher towards his father but much closer to his mother, jealous and unhappy about the polygamy of Philip. Things go out of hand during the banquet of the wedding, when Alexander, after Attalus offends his mother Olympias, insults Attalus and his father and is obliged to leave the palace, taking refuge to his uncle's palace.

Thanks to the help of Eumenes, the court secretary, he reconciled with his father and returned to the Royal Palace just in time for Cleopatra's marriage. However, Philip is murdered during the ceremony, which causes great sorrow to the young prince. The sorrow is then replaced by anger towards the murderer and the desire to catch the responsible. He then decidedly steps up to the throne. However, many people are not convinced by the new King Alexander, mostly due to his young age and lack of experience. Shortly after Alexander becomes king, Eurydice's children and Attalus are killed, and Eurydice herself takes her own life shortly after due to the unbearable sorrow. Alexander immediately decided to undertake a campaign in Greece and Asia to affirm Macedonia's position amongst the Pan-Hellenic League and expand its frontiers, just like his father wished to do when alive. His expedition first leads them to Thessaly, and his army, now featuring many of his boyhood friends but still a few veterans from Philip's army, records the first of a long sequence of victories.

== Poem ==
Every book of the Alexander trilogy bears a part of a poem on Alexander on the back cover.

And you, Alexander, sleepless in the dead of night

Where do your eyes roam?
Where does your heart wander?
Yours is a quest for far-off lands
Where the constellations set.

Where the last waves of the ocean die.

== Reception ==
Reviewer Daniel Thompson at Humanities 360 said the book said the constant use of place names, regions, and semantics interrupted the flow of reading; and that the book had a rushed ending.

== See also ==
- The Sands of Ammon
- The Ends of the Earth
- Valerio Massimo Manfredi
- Alexander the Great
- Philip II of Macedon
