= Abdul-Karim Gharaybeh =

Jordanian historian, academic and politician

- عبد الكريم غرايبة

Member of the Senate
- In office 17 November 2005 – 28 November 2007

Personal details
- Born: 20 June 1923 Irbid, Jordan
- Died: 22 February 2014 (aged 90)
- Occupation: Historian, academic

Abdul-Karim Mahmud Gharaybeh (20 June 1923 – 22 February 2014) was a Jordanian historian, academic and politician.

== Early life ==
Gharaybeh was born in Irbid on 20 June 1923. He started studying medicine but after his first anatomy lesson changed his major to history. In 1950 he earned his PhD from the School of Oriental and African Studies at the University of London. He was one of the first Jordanians to earn a PhD.

== Career ==
In 1956 he was the first Jordanian to be named Director General of the Department of Antiquities of Jordan. He succeeded Gerald Lankester Harding, who had headed the department between 1939 and 1956. Gharaybeh was himself succeeded by Saeed al-Durrah the same year he was appointed. He was a professor of history at the University of Jordan between 1962 and 1997.

Gharaybeh was appointed senator in the twenty-first Senate of Jordan, serving from 17 November 2005 until 28 November 2007.

In October 2007 he was one of the 138 Muslim signatories of the open letter "A Common Word Between Us and You" to Christian leaders calling for peace between the Muslim and Christian communities.

Gharaybeh, aged 90, died on 22 February 2014.

== Works ==
- In Arabic: تاريخ العرب الحديث، الأهلية للنشر والتوزيع، 1984
- English Traders in Syria 1744-1791. University of London, 1950
