= Pharnuches of Lycia =

Lycian-Macedonian general (d. 329 BCE?)

Pharnuches (Ancient Greek: Φαρνούχης or Φαρνούχoς) was a Lycian appointed by Alexander the Great to command the force sent into Sogdiana against Spitamenes in 329 BC. The result of the expedition was disastrous, with the destruction of the whole army. Pharnuches had been entrusted with its superintendence, because he was acquainted with the language of the inhabitants of the region, and had shown much dexterity in his intercourse with them. According to Aristobulus he was conscious of his deficiency in military skill, and wished to cede the command to the three Macedonian officers who were acting under him (Caranus, Menedemus and Andromachus), but they refused to accept it.
