= Ariston (actor) =

Ancient Greek actor

Ariston (Ancient Greek: Ἀρίστων) was a comic actor, who in 324 BC performed at the Susa weddings arranged by Alexander the Great to unify Greek and Persian cultures.
