= Ariston of Macedon =

- Birth name: Ariston
- Conflicts: battle of Gaugamela

Ariston (Greek: Ἀρίστων) was a Greek cavalry officer at the battle of Gaugamela, where his squadron was stationed between those of Glaucias and Sopolis.
