= Alexandre et Roxane =

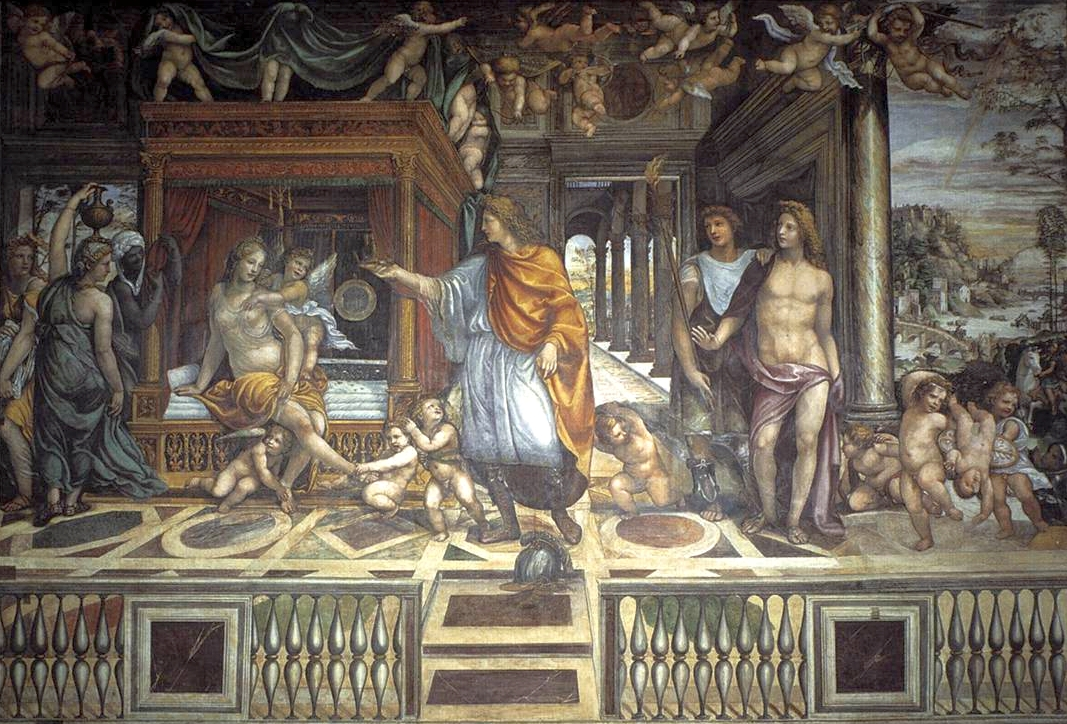
Marriage of Alexander and Roxana by Il Sodoma (c. 1517)

Alexandre et Roxane was a two-act French language opera to be written by Wolfgang Amadeus Mozart in 1778 in Paris.

The opera never came to fruition, although it has been suggested that the music for Jean-Georges Noverre's ballet Les petits riens, K. Anh. 10/299b, also from 1778, was originally composed for the projected opera.

The subject of the libretto was Alexander the Great and his marriage to the Bactrian noble Roxana.
