= Spartan (book) =

1988 historical novel by Valerio Massimo Manfredi

- Front cover of the book
- Author: Valerio Massimo Manfredi
- Language: Italian
- Genre: Historical Novel
- Publisher: Mondadori (Italy); Pan Books (UK)
- Publication date: 1988
- Publication place: Italy
- Media type: Print paperback

Spartan (original title: Lo Scudo di Talos) is a historical fiction novel written by the Italian writer Valerio Massimo Manfredi in 1988. It tells the tale of two Spartan brothers: Brithos, the elder of the two, a strong and healthy boy and Talos, a crippled and weak. Because of the rigorous Spartan laws, Talos must be sacrificed to the wolves of Mount Taygetus as his physical weakness would not permit him to help the military city of Sparta during its many wars. However, the young Talos miraculously survives. Nobody would have imagined that the two brothers would ever meet again and even less so that they would meet on a battlefield.

== Plot ==
Spartan is the story of two brothers born in the military city-state of Sparta. The elder brother, Brithos, was a Spartan paragon; the younger brother, Talos, was crippled and deformed at birth. Because of the cruel and strict laws in vigour at Sparta, babies that were deformed, crippled or had any health issues would not serve the city-state its purpose, which was to battle; therefore, these weaker children had to be sacrificed at Mount Taygetus. The young Talos however survives, rescued by a shepherd of the Helots, the people who served as slaves to the Spartans. This shepherd, who becomes Talos' adoptive father, raises Talos with love and recounts him the intriguing tale of Aristodemus, the last King of the Helots. The legend goes that he who wears his armour, shall be the one to free the Helots from slavery.

However, the blood that runs in his veins is Spartan after all; Talos the Cripple is drawn back to his hometown and in the midst of the legendary Battle of Thermopylae. Here he faces the inhuman brutality and savagery of the Spartan soldiers and meets his brother for the first time since their separation. When he crosses his brother's gaze whilst attempting to protect Antinea, the woman he loves. But destiny has got a better fate for them in store: as a war between the Achaemenid Empire and the Greek city-states looms, the two brothers will find each other again and will fight shoulder to shoulder for the future of their country. Along the way, he discovers some thing of his Spartan life like his real name is Kleidemos. When his brother dies, he oversees the Helots, with the help of his friend Karas, helps the Helots have victory over his own race.
