= Alexander IV of Macedon =

King of Macedonia from 323 to 311/304 BC

Alexander IV
- Megas Basileus
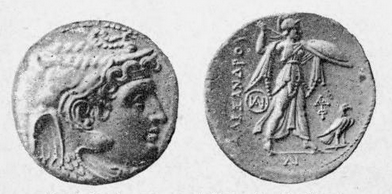

King of Macedonia
- Reign: 323–311/304 BC
- Predecessor: Philip III
- Successor: Cassander

Pharaoh of Egypt
- Reign: 317–311/304 BC
- Predecessor: Philip III
Successor
Ptolemy I
Royal titulary
Horus name
Hunu weser pehty
The youthful one, powerful of strength
G5	V28 E34 n A17 F12 S29 D40 F9 F9
Nebty name
Mery netjeru, redi en.ef iaut en it.ef
Beloved of the gods, to whom the office of his father was given
G16	nTrw N36 r D36 n I9 O44 t Z1 n t I9 I9
Golden Horus
Heqa nakht em ta (er)-djer-ef
Victorious ruler in the entire land
G8	HqA q D40 Aa15 N16 M36 I9
Prenomen
Haa ib re, setep en imen
Who (continually) rejoices over the mind Re, chosen by Amun
Ra makes the heart rejoice, elected by Amun

M23 X1 L2 X1	N5 A28 W23 i Y5 n U21 n
Nomen
Aleksindres
Alexandros

G39 N5	A rw k z i n d r z

King of Persia as Alexander II
- Reign: 323–311/304 BC
- Predecessor: Philip III
- Successor: Seleucus I
- Born: Summer 323 BC; Babylon
- Died: Between 311-304 BC (aged 11-19); Macedon
- Burial: Possibly Vergina, Tomb III
- Dynasty: Argead
- Father: Alexander III of Macedon
- Mother: Roxana of Bactria
- Religion: Ancient Greek religion

Alexander IV (Greek: Ἀλέξανδρος; Summer 323 BC – 311/304 BC), sometimes called Aegus, was the younger son of Alexander the Great (Alexander III of Macedon) by his wife Roxana of Bactria, born after his father's death. As his father's only surviving legitimate child, Alexander IV inherited the throne of the Macedonian Empire after him; however, he was murdered in his teens, never wielding the actual power.

== Birth ==
Alexander IV was the son of Alexander the Great (a Macedonian Greek) and his wife Roxana (a Sogdian). He had an older full brother who died in infancy in 326 BC, as well as a half brother named Heracles who was the result of an informal relationship between Alexander the Great and Barsine. Heracles's illegitimacy made Alexander IV the primary successor of his father, despite the fact he was younger.

Because Roxana was between six and eight months pregnant when Alexander the Great died on 11 June 323 BC and the sex of the baby was unknown, there was dissension in the Macedonian army regarding the order of succession. While the infantry supported Alexander the Great's half-brother Philip III (who had some unknown cognitive disability present throughout his life), the chiliarch Perdiccas, commander of the elite Companion cavalry, persuaded them to wait in the hope that Roxana's child would be male. The factions compromised, deciding that Perdiccas would rule the Empire as regent while Philip would reign, but only as a figurehead with no real power. If the child was male, then he would be king. Alexander IV was born in the second half of 323 BC.

== Regents ==
After a severe regency, military failure in Egypt, and mutiny in the army, Perdiccas was assassinated by his senior officers in May or June 321 or 320 BC (problems with Diodorus's chronology have made the year uncertain), after which Antipater was named as the new regent at the Partition of Triparadisus. He brought with him Roxana and the two kings to Macedon and gave up the pretence of ruling Alexander's Empire, leaving former provinces in Egypt and Asia under the control of the satraps. When Antipater died in 319 BC he left Polyperchon, a Macedonian general who had served under Philip II and Alexander the Great, as his successor, passing over his own son, Cassander.

Wall relief depicting King Alexander IV, 317–310 BC, Louvre Museum.

== Civil war ==
Cassander allied himself with Ptolemy Soter, Antigonus and Eurydice, the ambitious wife of king Philip Arrhidaeus, and declared war upon the regency. Polyperchon was allied with Eumenes and Olympias.

Although Polyperchon was successful at first, taking control of the Greek cities, his fleet was destroyed by Antigonus in 318 BC. When, after the battle, Cassander assumed full control of Macedon, Polyperchon was forced to flee to Epirus, followed by Roxana and the young Alexander. A few months later, Olympias was able to persuade her relative Aeacides of Epirus to invade Macedon with Polyperchon. When Olympias took the field, Eurydice's army refused to fight against the mother of Alexander and defected to Olympias, after which Polyperchon and Aeacides retook Macedon. Philip and Eurydice were captured and executed on December 25, 317 BC, leaving Alexander IV king, and Olympias in effective control, as she was his regent.

Cassander returned in the following year (316 BC), conquering Macedon once again. Olympias was immediately executed, while the king and his mother were taken prisoner and held in the citadel of Amphipolis under the supervision of Glaucias. When the general peace between Cassander, Antigonus, Ptolemy, and Lysimachus put an end to the Third Diadoch War in 311 BC, the peace treaty recognized Alexander IV's rights and explicitly stated that when he came of age he would succeed Cassander as ruler.

== Death ==
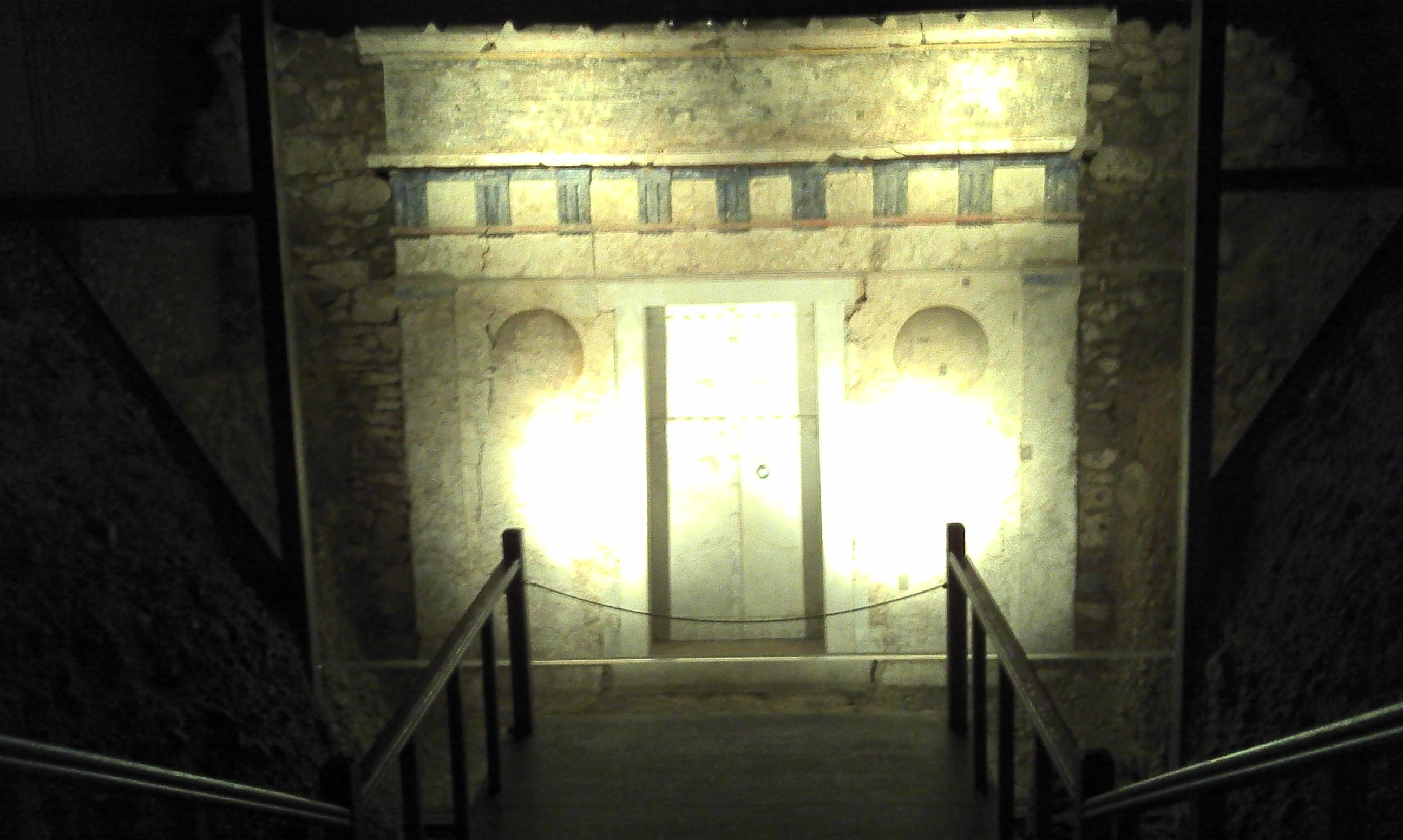
Tomb III in Vergina, which probably belonged to Alexander IV

Following the treaty, defenders of the Argead dynasty began to declare that Alexander IV should now exercise full power and that a regent was no longer needed, since he reached his teenage years. Cassander's response was definitive: to secure his rule, in 309 BC he commanded Glaucias to secretly assassinate the teenage Alexander IV and his mother. These orders were carried out. According to Pausanias the two were poisoned.

The year of death is contested, within range between 311 and 304 BC. According to ancient Macedonian scholars N.G.L. Hammond and F.W. Walbank in A History of Macedonia Vol. 3 he was killed in the late summer of 309 BC, shortly after his alleged half-brother Heracles. However, classical historian Peter Green argues Heracles was killed after Alexander IV's assassination. Alexander IV was recognized as the King in Egypt and Babylonia until 304 BC; it was suggested that years were attributed under his sovereignty posthumously in the absence of other rulers, however, Harry Tolley argues the young king in fact lived until this year.

One of the royal tombs discovered by the archaeologist Manolis Andronikos in the so-called "Great Tumulus" in Vergina in 1977/8 is believed to belong to Alexander IV. His presumed skeleton appear to belong to the youth in mid-to-late rather than early teens, which would support the later date for his death.

Alexander IV of Macedon Argead dynasty Born: 323 BC Died: 311/304 BC
Regnal titles
Preceded by Philip III	King of Macedon; 323–311/304 BC	Succeeded by Cassander
Preceded by Philip III	King of Persia; 323–311/304 BC	Succeeded by Seleucus I Nicator
Preceded by Philip III	Pharaoh of Egypt; 317–311/304 BC	Succeeded by Ptolemy I Soter
Preceded by Philip III	King of Thrace; 323–311/304 BC	Succeeded by Lysimachus
Preceded by Philip III	King of Asia Minor; 323–311/304 BC	Succeeded by Antigonus I Monophthalmus
