= Valerio Massimo Manfredi =

Italian writer and archaeologist (born 1943)

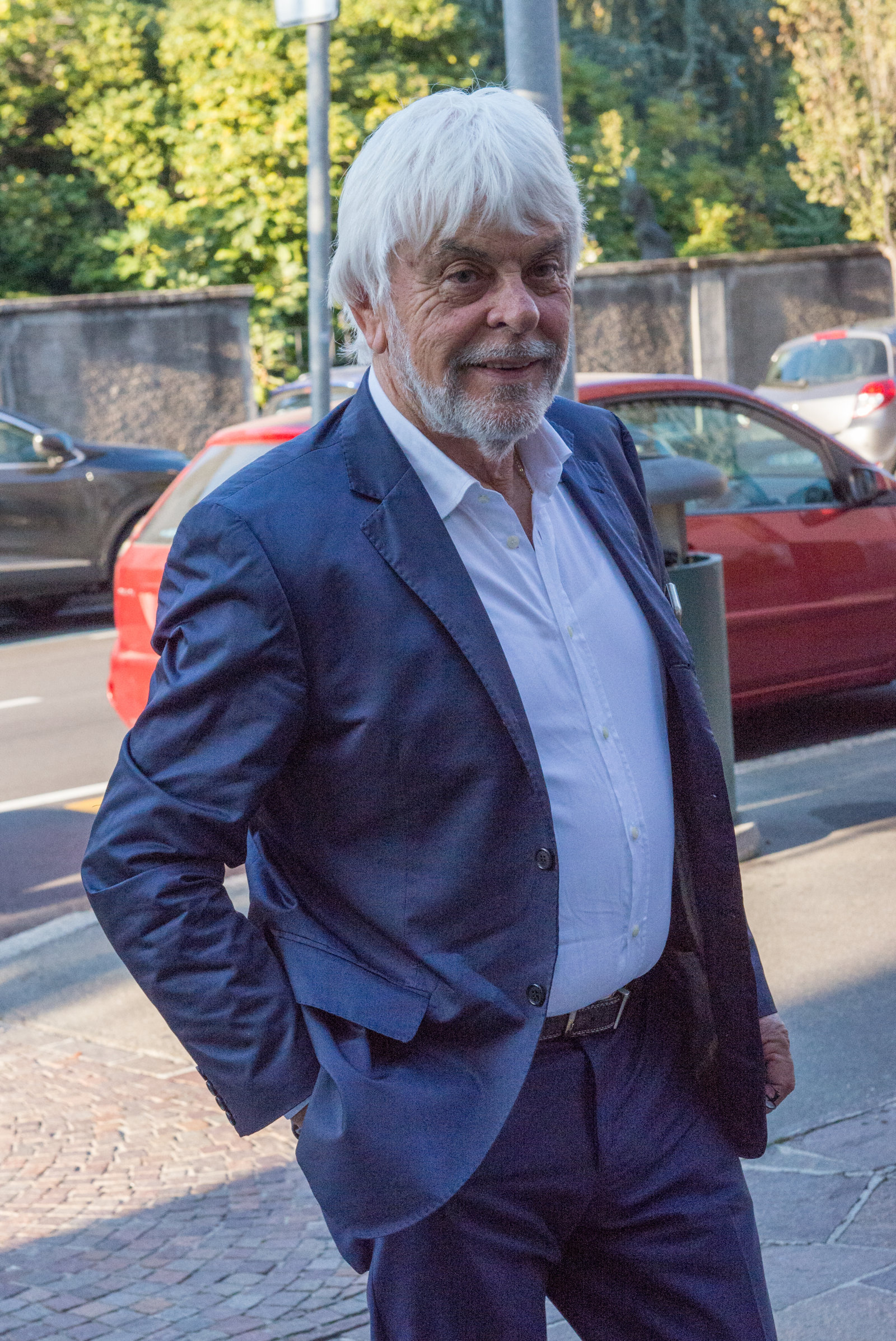
- Born: 8 March 1943 (age 83); Castelfranco Emilia, province of Modena, Emilia-Romagna, Italy
- Occupations: Writer; essayist; historian; archaeologist; journalist
- Spouse: Christine Fedderson Manfredi
- Writing career
- Period: 1980–present
- Genre: Historical drama
- Notable work: Alexander trilogy

Valerio Massimo Manfredi (born 8 March 1943) is an Italian historian, writer, essayist, archaeologist and journalist.

== Biography ==
He was born in Piumazzo di Castelfranco Emilia province of Modena and, after getting a degree in Classical Arts at the University of Bologna, he became an archaeologist at the Catholic University of Milan, specialising in the topography of the Ancient World.

At the Università Cattolica del Sacro Cuore itself, he taught from 1980 to 1986, then moved on to an academic career at the University of Venice (1987) and then at the Loyola University of Chicago, the Sorbonne University in Paris and the Bocconi University in Milan. However, due to his numerous commitments, both national and international, he can no longer lecture full-time, but he holds a visiting professor role.

Between the 1970s and the 1980s, he undertook the "Anabasis" expeditions for the reconstruction of the itinerary of the Ten Thousand's retreat. This expedition covered a total of 18,000 km, with 2,000 photographs being taken. He undertook and led numerous other expeditions, such as: Lavinium, Forum Gallorum and Forte Urbano in Italy, Túcume (Peru), Har Karkom and other overseas locations.

He has also held a series of conferences and seminars at the University of Oxford, University of California, National University of Canberra, Universidad de Antiochia, Universidad de Bilbao, Universidad Internacional Menendez Pelayo in Tenerife and many others.

He has published many academic essays and articles, and he has written several best-selling novels (amounting to a total of about 8 million copies sold worldwide). He also writes for many newspapers and magazines as a scientific journalist, both in Italy (e.g., "Il Messaggero", "Panorama", "Archeo", "Focus") and in Spain (Spanish edition of "Focus" and "El Mundo").

His novel The Last Legion was the basis for the movie of the same title, released in 2007 and starring Colin Firth, Ben Kingsley and others; his Alexander Trilogy has been bought by Universal Pictures for yet another cinematic rendition of the story of Alexander the Great. He has also written the screenplays for Marco d'Aviano and Gilgamesh and he has adapted Le Memorie di Adriano for cinema screening. Furthermore, he has hosted the television series Stargate – linea di confine for three seasons already on the Italian TV channel LA7 and he will also host Impero (Empire) on the very same channel.

On 11 February 2021, Manfredi and fellow writer Antonella Prenner were found unconscious at his home in Rome, after suffering a domestic incident caused by an accidental gas leak. They were hospitalized in Grosseto; their conditions were described as critical. They were later released.

== Bibliography ==
=== Novels ===
- Palladion (1985)
- Spartan (Lo scudo di Talos, 1988)
- The Oracle (L'oracolo, 1990)
- Heroes, earlier titled Talisman of Troy (Le paludi di Hesperia, 1994)
- The Tower (La torre della solitudine, 1996)
- The Alexander Trilogy (Trilogia di Aléxandros, 1998)
  - Child of a Dream (Il figlio del sogno)
  - The Sands of Ammon (Le sabbie di Amon)
  - The Ends of the Earth (Il confine del mondo)
- Pharaoh (Il faraone delle sabbie, 1998
- Chimaira ("Chimera", 2001)
- I cento cavalieri (Short story collection, 2002)
- The Last Legion (L'ultima legione, 2002)
- Tyrant (Il Tiranno, 2003)
- The Island of the Dead (L'isola dei morti, 2003)
- Empire of Dragons (L'impero dei draghi, 2005)
- The Lost Army (L'armata perduta, 2007)
- The Ides of March (Idi di marzo, 2008)
- The Ancient Curse (L'antica maledizione, 2010)
- A Winter's Night (Otel Bruni, 2011)
- Odysseus: The Oath (Il mio nome è Nessuno. Il giuramento, 2013)
- Odysseus: The Return (Il mio nome è Nessuno. Il ritorno, 2014)
- Wolves of Rome (Teutoburgo, 2016)
- Quinto comandamento (2018)
- Antica madre (2019)
- Quaranta giorni (2020)

=== Essays ===
- Greek Sea (Mare Greco. Eroi ed esploratori del mondo antico, 1994)
- The Celts in Italy (I Celti in Italia, 1999)
- Akropolis (2000)
- The Western Greeks (I Greci d'occidente, 2000)
- The Etruscans in the Pó Valley (Gli Etruschi in Val Padana, 2003)
- 2009 – La Tomba di Alessandro (2009)

=== Collaborations ===
- Vignola 1575 – Un oscuro delitto (with Omar Calabrese, 1999)

== Filmography ==
=== Movies based on his books ===
- 1998 – Tower of the Firstborn (I Guardiani del Cielo)
- 2007 – The Last Legion

=== Screenplays ===
- 2006 – The Inquiry (L'Inchiesta)
- 2009 – Memoirs of Hadrian

=== Actor ===
- 2001 – Vajont – La Diga del Disonore
