= Pausanias =

Pausanias (Greek: Παυσανίας) may refer to:

- Pausanias the Regent, Spartan general and regent of the 5th century BC
- Pausanias of Sicily, physician of the 5th century BC, who was a friend of Empedocles
- Pausanias of Athens, lover of the poet Agathon and a character in Plato's Symposium c. 420 BC
- Pausanias (king of Sparta), King of Sparta from 408 to 395 BC
- Pausanias of Macedon, King of Macedon from 399 to 393 BC
- Pausanias (pretender), pretender to the throne of Macedon in the 360s BC
- Pausanias of Orestis, bodyguard who assassinated Philip II of Macedon in 336 BC
- Pausanias of Damascus, Greek historian of the last quarter of the 2nd century BC
- Pausanias (geographer), Greek traveller, geographer, and writer (Description of Greece) of the 2nd century AD
- Pafsanias Katsotas (1896-1991), Greek general and mayor of Athens
