= Jordan Antiquities Database and Information System =

Computer database of antiquities in Jordan

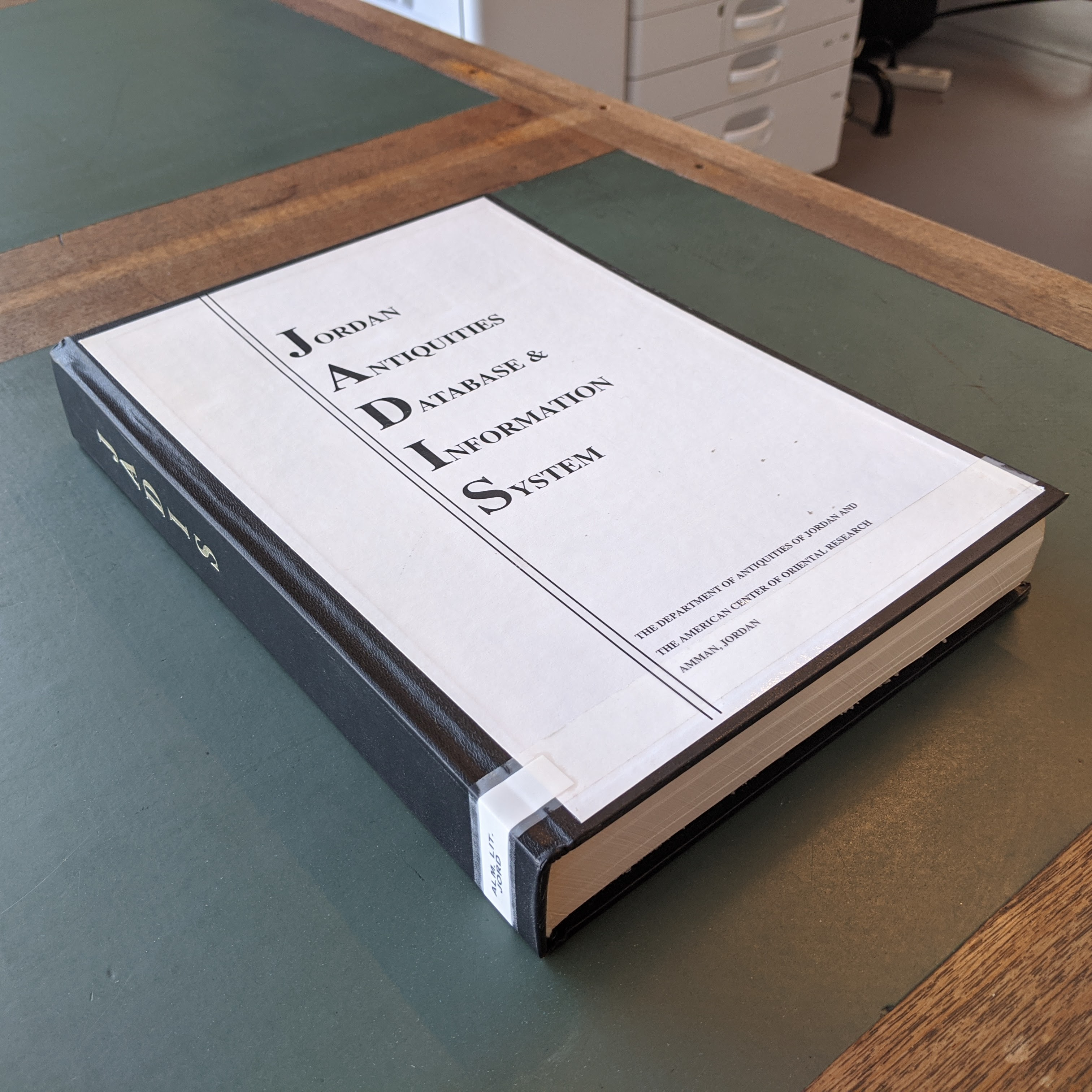
Printed summary of the JADIS database, published in 1994.

The Jordan Antiquities Database and Information System (JADIS) was a computer database of antiquities in Jordan, the first of its kind in the Arab world. It was established by the Department of Antiquities in 1990, in cooperation with the American Center for Oriental Research in Amman and sponsored by the United States Agency for International Development. JADIS was in use until 2002, when it was superseded by a new system, MEGA-J. Over 10,841 antiquities were registered in the database.

An introduction and printed summary of the database was published by the Department of Antiquities in 1994, edited by Gaetano Palumbo.
