= Department of Antiquities (Jordan) =

Jordanian government department

Hashemite Kingdom of Jordan Department of Antiquities
- دائرة الاثار العامة
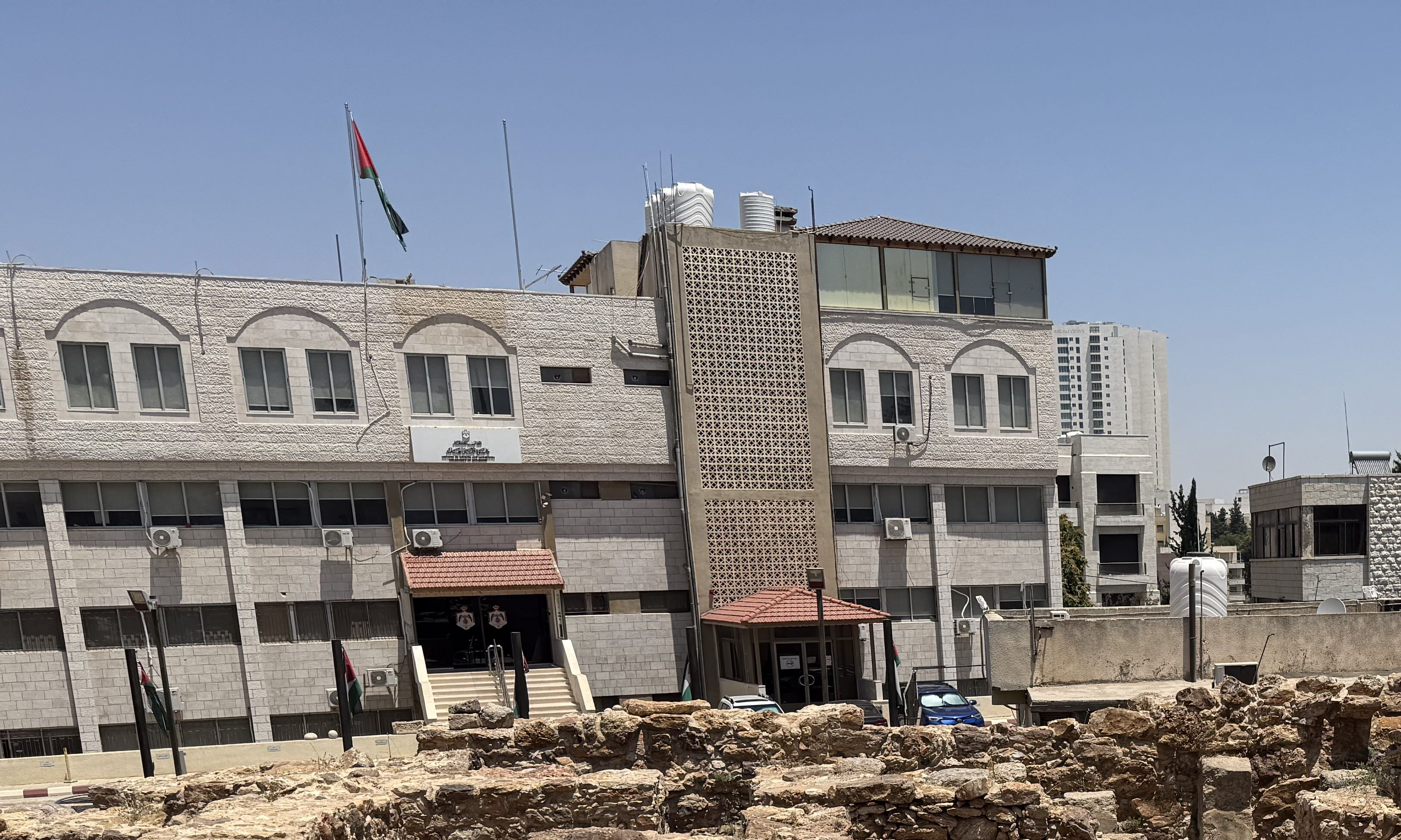
- Department of Antiquities building in Jabal Amman

Agency overview
- Jurisdiction: Government of Jordan
- Headquarters: Amman, Jordan
- Agency executive: Dr. Ziad Al Saad, General Director
- Parent department: Ministry of Tourism and Antiquities (Jordan)
- Website: https://doa.gov.jo/

The Department of Antiquities (Arabic: دائرة الآثار العامة, romanized: Dāʼirat al-Āthār al-ʻĀmmah) is a government department in the Hashemite Kingdom of Jordan with responsibility for archaeological research and cultural heritage management. It is part of the Ministry of Tourism and Antiquities.

The department was established in 1923 in what was then the Emirate of Transjordan, a protectorate of the British Empire. Its responsibilities are legislated for in laws no. 24 of 1934, no. 21 of 1988 and no. 22 of 2004.

The department has organised an international conference on the history and archaeology of Jordan every three years since 1980.

== Historical background ==
Initially part of the Department of Palestinian Antiquities, the Department of Antiquities was formed to collect and safeguard antiquities scattered across Jordan. The legal framework governing its operations was established through Law No. 21 in 1988, which defines antiquities as any human-made object predating 1700 AD, encompassing a wide range of artifacts including sculptures, manuscripts, and architectural remains.

== Structure and responsibilities ==
The department is managed by a director general who reports directly to the minister of tourism and antiquities. Its responsibilities include:

- Supervision of Archaeological Work: The department oversees both local and foreign archaeological missions, ensuring compliance with Jordan's archaeological strategy
- Approval of Excavation Requests: All requests for archaeological excavations or surveys must be submitted to the Department for evaluation and approval
- Scientific Research and Documentation: The Directorate of Studies and Research within the department publishes scientific reports and maintains comprehensive documentation related to Jordan's antiquities

== Publications (print and online) ==
- Annual of the Department of Antiquities of Jordan (ADAJ), an academic journal published since 1951
- The Middle Eastern Geodatabase for Antiquities – Jordan (MEGA-J), a comprehensive public geographic information system and database of archaeological sites in the country, developed in cooperation with the Getty Conservation Institute to replace the Jordan Antiquities Database and Information System (JADIS)

== Cultural heritage management ==
The department plays a crucial role in preserving Jordan's cultural heritage, which includes several UNESCO World Heritage Sites such as Petra, Wadi Rum, and Qusayr Amra. It collaborates with international organizations like UNESCO to enhance the protection and management of these sites.

== Directors general ==
The department is headed by a director general.

- Ridha Tawfiq, 1923–1928
- Tawfiq Abu al-Huda, 1929
- Ala Edein Toqan, 1931
- Adeeb al-Kayed, 1933
- Hisham Kair, 1933–1939
- Gerald Lankester Harding, 1939–1956. Harding's book "The Antiquities of Jordan" is still considered a reference to this day.
- Abd el–Kareem Gharaybeh, 1956
- Saeed al-Durrah, 1956–1959
- Awni al-Dajani, 1959–1968. Al-Dajani is the first Jordanian holder of a Ph.D. in Archaeology.
- Michael Jmaiaan, 1968
- Yaacoub Ouais, 1968–1971 and 1972–1977
- Mansour al-Bataineh, 1971–1972
- Adnan al-Hadidi 1977–1989
- Ghazi Bishah, 1989–1991 and 1994–1999
- Safwan al-Tall, 1991–1994
- Fawwaz al-Khraysheh, 1999–2010
- Ziad al-Saad, 2010–2011
- Faris al-Hmoud, 2011–2013
- Monther Jamhawi, 2013–2018
- Yazeed Alian, 2018-2021
- Ahmed Shami, (acting) Feb 2021-July 2021
- Hisham al-Abadi, July 2021-October 2021
- Fadi A. Bala'awi, October 2021-March 2024
- Fawzi Qassem Abu Danneh, March 2024-present

== See also ==
- Department of Antiquities
