= Menedemus (general) =

Ancient Greek general (d. 329 BCE)

Menedemus (Ancient Greek: Μενέδημος) was one of the generals of Alexander the Great, who was sent in 329 BC against Spitamenes, satrap of Sogdiana, but was surprised and slain, together with 2000 foot-soldiers and 300 horse.
