= Memnon of Rhodes =

4th-century BCE Greek mercenary commander

Memnon
- Μέμνων
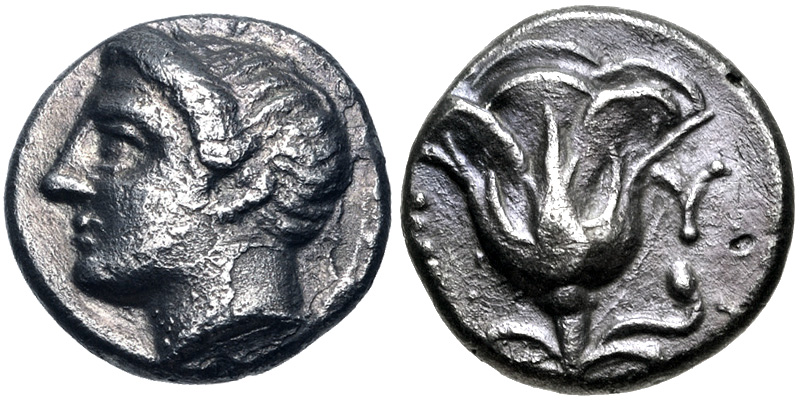
- Coinage of Memnon of Rhodes, Mysia. Mid 4th century BC
- Born: c. 380 BC; Rhodes
- Died: summer, 333 BC (aged c. 47)
- Spouse: Barsine (c. 340 BC)
- Children: At least 2
- Military career
- Allegiance: Achaemenid Empire
- Service years: 339 - 333 BC
- Conflicts: Battle of the Granicus; Siege of Halicarnassus

Memnon of Rhodes (Greek: Μέμνων ὁ Ῥόδιος; c. 380 – 333 BC) was a prominent Rhodian Greek commander in the service of the Achaemenid Empire. Related to the Persian aristocracy by the marriage of his sister to the satrap Artabazus II, together with his brother Mentor he served the Persian king for most of his life, and played an important role in the empire's defence during the invasion of Alexander the Great, in particular at the Siege of Halicarnassus, and even the decades before that.

Carl Otis Schuster notes that though often inaccurately described as "simply a mercenary", Memnon was arguably the toughest defender of the Persian Empire Alexander had to face, and was nearly successful in putting a halt to him.

== Biography ==
=== Under the governor of Phrygia ===
Not much is known about Memnon's early life. Born c. 380 BC in Rhodes, Memnon would serve the Achaemenid Empire for most of his life. He started his career in 358 BC by serving together with his brother Mentor under the Persian satrap (governor) Artabazos II. During his service to the Persian satrap, Artabazos II allowed Mentor to marry his daughter Barsine. Around 358 BC, Artabazos II staged a rebellion against the then ruling Persian Achaemenid king Artaxerxes II (r. 404–358), with Memnon and Mentor as his generals. When the revolt failed, Memnon and Artabazos II fled to Pella, the capital of Macedonia, whereas Memnon's brother Mentor fled to Egypt. Eventually, Mentor returned to Persian service around 343 BC.

=== In Macedon ===
During his visit in Macedon, Memnon became acquainted with Philip II and the young prince Alexander (later Alexander the Great), who was seven years old at the time. According to Plutarch, Memnon and Alexander had lengthy discussions, with Alexander reportedly having keen interest in Persia's military strength and tactics, amongst others. Though Schuster notes that the details of the conversations between Memnon and Alexander are difficult to verify, he does add that Memnon managed to get a proper impression of Philip II as a ruler, military leader and diplomat during his time in Pella. Moreover, it convinced him of Philip II's intentions to invade Persia, and he got a proper realization of the deep-seated Greek dissatisfaction vis-a-vis the Macedonian hegemony over Greece, including the political issues that came along with it for the Macedonians.

Through the "influence" of his brother, after a stay of about three to four years in Macedon, Memnon re-entered the Persian service, "with a clear understanding of Macedonia's military capabilities".

=== Defense of the Achaemenid Empire ===
==== Campaigns against Philip II ====
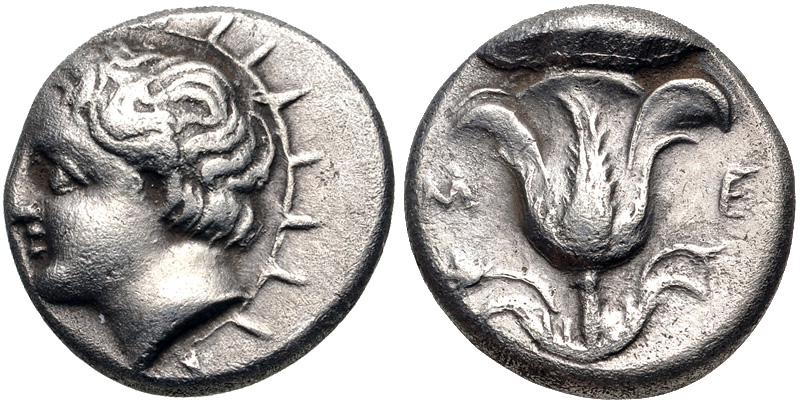
Coinage of Memnon of Rhodes, probably minted in Lampsakos, Mysia. Mid 4th century BC. Obv: Youthful head of Helios, with radiate solar disk. Rev: Rose with buds to either side, letter M-E on either sides.

When Mentor died c. 340 BC, Memnon married his widow Barsine. He had plural number of children, including at least one son by Barsine. In 339 BC, Memnon helped to defend Byzantium against an assault by Philip II. In 336 BC, Philip II sent Parmenion, with Amyntas, Andromenes and Attalus, and an army of 10,000 men into Anatolia to make preparations for an invasion to 'free' the Greeks living on the western coast and islands from Achaemenid rule. At first, all went well. The Greek cities on the western coast of Anatolia revolted until the news arrived that Philip II had been murdered and had been succeeded by his young son Alexander. The Macedonians were demoralized by Philip II's death and were subsequently defeated near Magnesia by the Achaemenids under the command of Memnon of Rhodes.

==== Campaigns against Alexander the Great ====
When Philip II's son Alexander invaded the Achaemenid Empire in 334 BC, Memnon, aware of the political issues the Macedonians dealt with, urged king Darius III (r. 336–330 BC) to orchestrate a rebellion in Greece and he advised the Persian satraps to lay waste to the land that Alexander would have to pass, depriving his army of food and supplies. This would make it harder for Alexander and his army to survive on their long journey before the battle. The satraps did not trust Memnon, and did not ravage their territories. Initially hesitant, Darius III made Memnon the commander of the western satrapies (provinces) after the defeat at the Battle of the Granicus. During the Siege of Halicarnassus, Memnon was the leading commander, and nearly defeated Alexander's attack. He then started using the empire's naval superiority against Alexander and started negotiations with Sparta in order to take the war to mainland Greece. He began a campaign to capture the Aegean islands using the Persian fleet and led a direct assault on Macedonia, while Alexander was resting at Phaselis. Memnon managed to capture the island of Chios and most of Lesbos. Demosthenes, after hearing of Memnon's successes, began to prepare Athens for a revolt against Alexander, along with other Greek cities, while Sparta began to prepare for war. By a stroke of fortune for Alexander, Memnon died during the siege of Mytilene, after transferring command to his nephew, Pharnabazus. Memnon's widow Barsine, according to Plutarch and Justin, later became Alexander's mistress and allegedly bore him a son, Heracles. After Alexander's death, Heracles contended for the throne with Nearchus' initial support (who himself had married Barsine's daughter by Mentor). Their bid met insufficient support, and Barsine and Heracles were murdered in 309 BC by Polyperchon.

== Assessment ==
Many scholars maintain that had Memnon's campaign been successful, Alexander would have had difficulty in continuing his campaign in Asia, and might have soon been defeated. Memnon's naval campaigns and the uprising he orchestrated in Sparta posed the greatest danger to Alexander since he had become king. Schuster notes that if Memnon had not died at Mytilene, "Alexander might have been forced to abandon Asia Minor and return home to defend his throne". Thus, when Alexander realized he had nearly been defeated, he decided to invade Achaemenid Phoenicia before he moved into the empire's interior. It was not until after the major Persian defeat at the Battle of Issus that Memnon's strategy was revitalised and finally put into action, but by then, the advantage had been lost, and Alexander showed himself willing to forfeit Greece, if necessary, for his greater goals.

== In fiction ==
- In the 1956 historical film Alexander the Great Memnon was portrayed by Peter Cushing.
- Memnon appears as an antagonist in the Japanese manga series Historié by Hitoshi Iwaaki.
- Memnon is portrayed by Steven Hartley in Netflix's 2024 drama docuseries Alexander: The Making of a God.
- Memnon is the protagonist of an eponymous 2006 novel by Scott Oden.
- In A Young Macedonian in the Army of Alexander the Great by Alfred John Church Charidemus is a prisoner guest of Memnon.

== Bibliography ==
=== Ancient sources ===
- Arrian. The Anabasis of Alexander – via gutenberg.org.
- Diodorus (1947) [1st century BC]. "Book 17". Library of History. Loeb Classical Library. Vol. 9. Translated by Perrin, Bernadotte – via LacusCurtius.
- Sextus Julius Frontinus. Stratagems. Translated by Bennett, Charles E. – via LacusCurtius.
- Plutarch (1919) [2nd century AD]. "Life of Alexander". Parallel Lives. Loeb Classical Library. Vol. 8. Translated by Perrin, Bernadotte. OCLC 40115288 – via LacusCurtius.
- Polyaenus (1793). "Book 5b". Strategems. Translated by Shepherd, R. – via Attalus.org.

=== Modern sources ===
- Green, Peter (1991). Alexander of Macedon, 356-323 B.C., A Historical Biography. University of California Press. ISBN 9780520375867.
- Heckel, Waldemar (2006). Who's Who in the Age of Alexander the Great: Prosopography of Alexander's Empire. Blackwell Publishing. ISBN 9781405112109.
- Schuster, Carl Otis (2016). "Memnon and Mentor of Rhodes (ca. 380–333, ca. 385–340)". In Phang, Sara E.; Spence, Iain; Kelly, Douglas; Londey, Peter (eds.). Conflict in Ancient Greece and Rome: The Definitive Political, Social, and Military Encyclopedia. ABC-CLIO. ISBN 978-1610690201.
