= Roxana =

Iranian noblewoman, wife of Alexander the Great

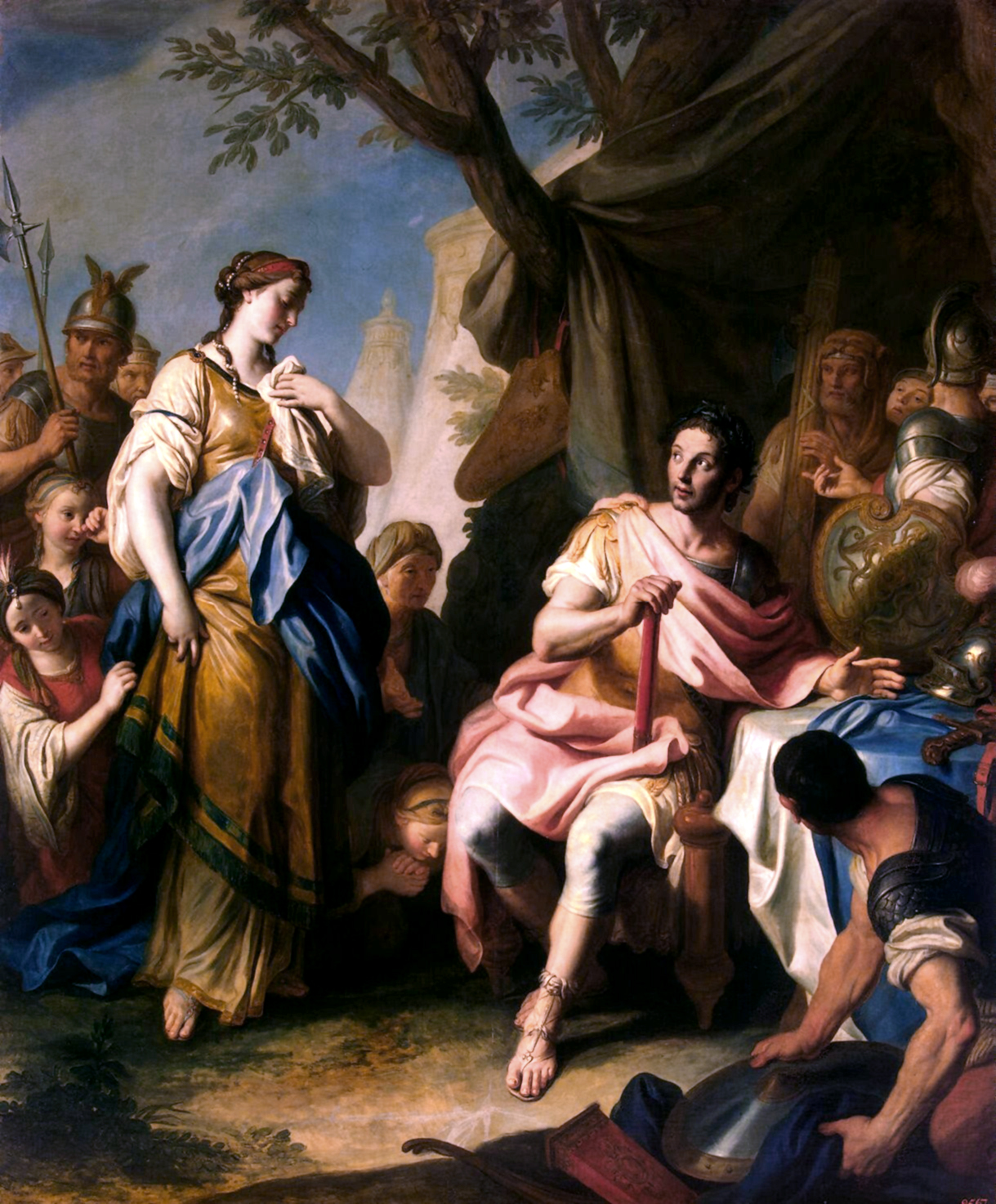
- Alexander the Great and Roxana, 1756 painting by Pietro Rotari

Queen consort of Macedonia, Egypt, and Persia
- Tenure: 327 – 10/11 June 323 BC
- Born: Bactria
- Died: 311/304 BC; Amphipolis, Macedon, Ancient Greece
- Spouse: Alexander the Great
- Issue: Unnamed first son Alexander IV
- Dynasty: Argead (by marriage)
- Father: Oxyartes
- Religion: Zoroastrianism

Roxana (died 311/304 BC, Ancient Greek: Ῥωξάνη, Rhōxánē; Old Iranian: *Raṷxšnā- "shining, radiant, brilliant", Persian: روشنک, romanized: Rawšanak) sometimes known as Roxanne, Roxanna, Roxzana, and Roxane, was a Bactrian or Sogdian princess who married Alexander the Great after he invaded Persia and defeated Darius, ruler of the Achaemenid Empire.

== Life ==
Roxana was the daughter of the Bactrian nobleman Oxyartes, satrap of Bactria and Sogdia. He served Bessus, and thus was probably involved in the murder of the last Achaemenid king: Darius III. The exact date of her birth is unknown, but she was of childbearing age by 326 BC.

After Bessus was captured by the Macedonian ruler Alexander the Great, Oxyartes and his family fled north, and continued to resist the invading Macedonian forces. Along with the Sogdian warlord Spitamenes, they took up a defensive position in a fortress known as the Sogdian Rock.

They were eventually defeated by the Macedonians. Afterwards, Alexander attended a celebration and reportedly fell in love with Roxana on sight. Where the celebration took place is disputed. It was possibly held at the Sogdian Rock or another fortress of Chorienes— also called Sisimithres by Quintus Rufus Curtius— but according to the Metz Epitome it was at the house of Chorienes where Roxana and Alexander were first introduced. Curtius apparently misrepresented Roxana as a daughter of Chorienes. Arrian states that Oxyartes surrendered to Alexander when he became aware of the good reception Alexander awarded his daughter Roxana. A.B. Bosworth mentions the possibility of Roxana being captured at the Sogdian Rock, and that the two were then married at the fortress of Chorienes.

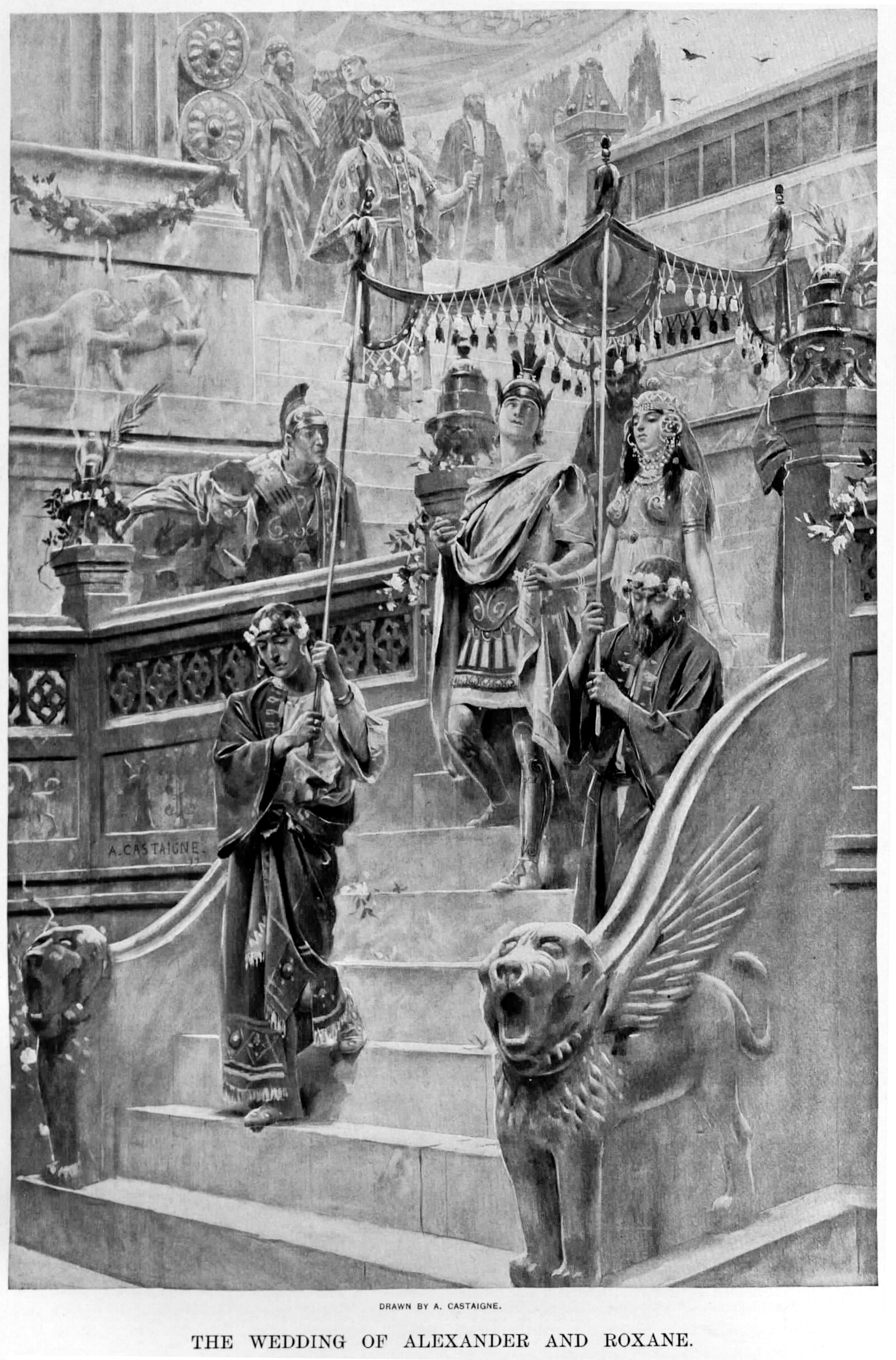
The Wedding of Alexander and Roxane (1898–1899), an engraving by André Castaigne.

=== Marriage to Alexander ===
The marriage between Roxana and Alexander took place in 327 BC, and according to the majority of the sources it was held in the Macedonian tradition rather than the Persian tradition. Sources agree that Alexander fell passionately in love with her, but considering that he had difficulties in occupying and controlling Sogdiana, his decision to marry Roxana may also have been motivated by the advantages of a political alliance; the Bactrian and Sogdian armies became more loyal towards Alexander afterwards.

Alexander married Roxana despite opposition from his companions, who would have preferred a Macedonian or Greek queen. Alexander thereafter made an expedition into India and while there he appointed Oxyartes as the governor of the Hindu Kush region adjoining India. According to the Metz Epitome, Roxana accompanied Alexander into India, where their first-born son died in infancy near the banks of the Hydaspes in the autumn of 326 BC; the event is considered a fact by most scholars. The Alexander Romance alleges that the child died at 9 months and was named after his father.

When Alexander returned to Susa in spring 324 BC, he promoted Histanes, Roxana's brother, to the elite cavalry. To encourage a better acceptance of his government among the Persians, Alexander also married Stateira II (the daughter of the deposed Persian king Darius III) and Parysatis II (the daughter of Artaxerxes III).

=== After Alexander's Death ===
After Alexander's sudden death at Babylon in 323 BC, Roxana is believed to have murdered Stateira. According to Plutarch, she also had Stateira's sister, Drypetis, murdered with the consent of Perdiccas. During this time, Roxana was pregnant. This caused tensions between the Macedonian soldiers who opposed a so-called Persianization of the Macedonian court, and the loyalists around Perdiccas and Ptolemy who suggested waiting to see if the child was a son and naming either a caretaker regent or a council to govern on his behalf.

A temporary compromise was found when Philip Arrhidaeus was declared king of Macedon; if the unborn child was a son, he was to become a king as well. Roxana gave birth to a son, Alexander IV, in 323 BC. According to Strabo, Roxana alongside her son and stepson Heracles, as well as Arrhidaeus, accompanied Perdiccas on his failed invasion on Egypt.

By 317 BC, the young Alexander lost his kingship as a result of intrigues started by Philip Arrhidaeus' wife, Eurydice II. Afterwards, Roxana and the young Alexander were protected by Alexander the Great's mother, Olympias, in Macedonia. Following Olympias' assassination in 316 BC, Cassander imprisoned Roxana and her son in the citadel of Amphipolis. Their detention was condemned by the Macedonian general Antigonus in 315 BC. In 311 BC, a peace treaty between Antigonus and Cassander confirmed the kingship of Alexander IV but also Cassander as his guardian, following which the Macedonians demanded his release. However, Cassander ordered Glaucias of Macedon to kill Alexander and Roxana, possibly by poisoning. The death date is contested; Edward Anson suggests that they were murdered in spring 310 BC, but their death was concealed until the summer. Daniel Ogden dates their death to 311 BC, and Aiden Dodson and Dyan Hilton assume the event happened either in 310 or 309 BC.

Because Alexander IV was still recognized as sovereign in some part of Macedonian Empire until 304 BC, and because his presumed skeleton belongs to the youth in his mid-to-late teens, Harry Tolley argues the young king in fact lived past 309 BC and was killed (presumably alongside Roxana) in 305/304 BC.

== Legacy ==
- Asteroid 317 Roxane is named in her honor.
- At the Acropolis, there were found inscriptions of offerings Roxana dedicated as Alexander's wife to Athena.
- Lucian describes a painting of Roxana's marriage to Alexander by the Greek painter Echion (also known as Aetion) which won the painter the consent of the Olympic Hellanodike Proxenidas to marry his daughter.
- In one of the versions of the Alexander Romances, Darius III is her father and dying gives his consent to the marriage in which she wears the royal jewelry Alexander had requested from his mother Olympias. The marriage takes then place in Darius' palace.

== See also ==
- Alexandre et Roxane, an opera that Mozart planned to write
- Ancient history of Afghanistan
- Balkh
- Roshanak
- Transcontinental royal intermarriage

== Sources ==
- Badian, Ernst (2015). "Rhoxane ii. Alexander's Wife". Encyclopædia Iranica.
- Renault, Mary (2001). The Nature of Alexander the Great. Penguin. ISBN 978-0-14-139076-5.
- Plutarch (1919). Perrin, Bernadotte (ed.). Plutarch, Alexander. Perseus Project.
- Plutarch (1936). Babbitt, Frank Cole (ed.). On the Fortune of Alexander. Vol. IV. Loeb Classical Library. pp. 379–487.
- Horn, Bernd; Spencer, Emily, eds. (2012). No Easy Task: Fighting in Afghanistan. Dundurn Press Ltd. p. 40. ISBN 978-1-4597-0164-9.
