= Mentor of Rhodes =

4th-century BC Greek soldier and mercenary

- Μέντωρ Ῥόδιος
- Born: c. 385 BC; Rhodes
- Died: c. 340 BC (aged c. 45)
- Spouse: Barsine
- Children: 3 daughters, including wife of Nearchus
- Military career
- Allegiance: Achaemenid Empire; Thirtieth Dynasty of Egypt
- Service years: 358 - 340 BC

Location of Rhodes.

Mentor of Rhodes (Ancient Greek: Μέντωρ Ῥόδιος) (c. 385 BC – c. 340 BC) was a Greek mercenary and later Satrap of the Asiatic coast. He fought both for and against Artaxerxes III of Persia. He is also known as the first husband of Barsine, who later became a mistress to Alexander the Great.

In 358 BC, Mentor, along with his brother Memnon, were hired to provide military leadership by a rebel Persian satrap, Artabazus. Despite Mentor's capable leadership, the rebellion failed, and Artabazus, Barsine and Memnon fled to Macedon, where they were welcomed by Philip II. Mentor fled to Egypt.

Pharaoh Nectanebo II immediately enlisted the aid of the Greek mercenary, as he expected a Persian invasion was imminent. The pharaoh sent Mentor, at the head of 4000 mercenaries, to support Sidon, which had rebelled from Persia. Although Mentor won significant victories against some of the satraps, he was unable to defeat Artaxerxes' army, and was captured in 346 BC.

Upon his capture, Artaxerxes evidently recognized Mentor's skills, and pardoned him. Immediately, Mentor was sent to aid in the invasion of his former refuge, Egypt. During the Egyptian campaign, Mentor led one of three divisions of the great king's Hellenic army. Mentor shared the command with Bagoas, a Persian of some note whom Diodorus of Sicily describes as the man 'whom the King trusted most, a man exceptionally daring and impatient of propriety'. The pair had some success in Egypt taking Bubastus, along with other cities, by one cunning device: garrisoning the cities were both native Egyptians and Greek mercenary troops, so Mentor offered one side or the other a favourable surrender leading to infighting within the garrisons which weakened their effectiveness and made it much easier for the Persians to gain the city by subterfuge. This tactic proved critical in the battle for Egypt. With Nectanebo facing the loss of so many of his fortified towns and cities, he withdrew from Memphis towards the south, choosing not to contest his kingship in pitched battle.

After the defeat of Egypt, "Artaxerxes, seeing that Mentor the general had performed great services for him in the war against the Egyptians, advanced him over and above his other friends." The king appointed Mentor his commander in the west in 342 BC and satrap of the Asiatic coast; he was also given a vast trove of silver. One of his actions during his short tenure at satrap was to pardon Artabazus, whom he allowed to return home, along with Barsine and Memnon. Mentor died after just four years in his post. His daughter later married Nearchus while Barsine married Memnon. Memnon received Mentor's command after his brother's death.
