= Heracles of Macedon =

Son of Alexander the Great (327/324–c.309/304 BCE)

Heracles

Pretender of the kingdom of Macedonia
- Reign: 309/304 BC
- Predecessor: Alexander IV (as King)
- Born: 327/324 BC; Bactria
- Died: 309/304 BC (aged 14-24); Kingdom of Macedonia
- Burial: Aegae
- House: Argead dynasty
- Father: Alexander the Great
- Mother: Barsine
- Religion: Ancient Greek Religion

Heracles of Macedon (Ancient Greek: Ἡρακλῆς; c. 327/324 – 309/304 BC) was an illegitimate son of Alexander the Great of Macedon by Barsine, daughter of Satrap Artabazus of Phrygia. Heracles was named after the Greek mythological hero of the same name, from whom the Argeads claimed descent.

== Life ==
Heracles was born in 327/326 BC (according to Diodorus Siculus) or 325/324 BC (according to Justin) to Alexander the Great and Barsine.

Mary Renault is skeptical of Alexander's paternity, due to scarce contemporary sources on the matter:

No record at all exists of such a woman accompanying his march; nor of any claim by her, or her powerful kin, that she had borne him offspring. Yet twelve years after his [Alexander's] death a boy was produced, seventeen years old, born therefore five years after Damascus, [Where Alexander and Barsine reportedly first met] her alleged son, ‘brought up in Pergamon’; a claimant and shortlived pawn in the succession wars, chosen probably for a physical resemblance to Alexander. That he actually did marry another Barsine (Stateira, often referred to in Greek sources as Barsine) must have helped both launch and preserve the story; but no source reports any notice whatever taken by him [Alexander] of a child who, Roxane's being posthumous, would have been during his lifetime his only son, by a near-royal mother. In a man who named cities after his horse and dog, this strains credulity.

Renault points that if Heracles was Alexander's illegitimate child, it should raise question why he, as Alexander's only known son at the time of his death, was not immediately drawn into the succession disputes, and why he was passed over in favour of Philip Arrhidaeus - who was only a son of Alexander's father Philip, and thus a more distant claimant than Heracles. She concludes that the romance with Barsine was invented retrospectively to validate Heracles' parentage.

However, her view is contradicted by Justin's claim that it was Alexander's himself who named Heracles; the act is seen by Daniel Ogden as done by the King in the honour of their mythical ancestor, Heracles.

Jerzy Besala notes that "curiously, none of the [Alexander's] commanders questioned Alexander's paternity" and he believes that the reason behind Heracles's being ignored was the boy's illegitimate parentage.

On Alexander's death Nearchus, who was then son-in-law of Barsine, advocated for Heracles' inheritance, but was unsuccessful. According to Strabo, Heracles alongside his younger half-brother Alexander IV and stepmother Roxana accompanied Perdiccas into military expedition to Egypt against Ptolemy, which implies he was treated as a child of the late King and a part of the royal family.

At some point Polyperchon, a regent of Macedon who had been replaced by Cassander and had all but disappeared for the previous six years, began championing Heracles as Alexander's true heir, and Polyperchon began forming an army. Instead of fighting, Cassander negotiated with Polyperchon. By offering Polyperchon various bribes such as a sinecure and a large number of talents, Cassander persuaded him to murder Heracles, and Polyperchon retired to obscurity once more. According to Plutarch, the young man was strangled or garroted, while Pausanias claims he was poisoned.

It is the matter of contestion whether Heracles's death happened before or after Alexander IV's own murder; N.G.L. Hammond and F.W. Walbank in A History of Macedonia Vol. 3 argues Heracles was killed in 309 BC, before his half-brother's death, however, according to Peter Green Heracles was killed after Alexander IV's assassination. Additionally, as Alexander IV was still recognized as the King in Egypt and Babylonia until 304 BC, and because his possible skeletal remains belong to youth in mid-to-late teens, Harry Tolley argues the young king in fact lived some years past 309. This further makes unclear in which year Heracles died, though Tolley himself believes Heracles was killed "many years" before his younger half-brother.

== Family tree ==
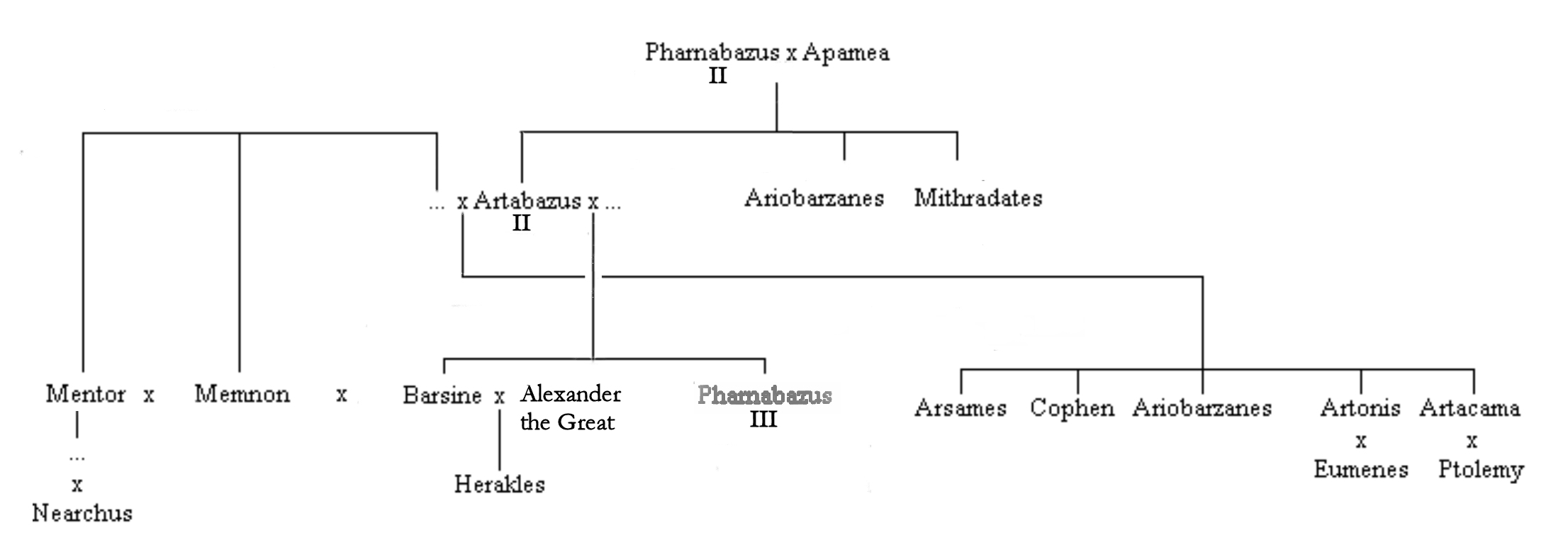
Family tree down to Heracles of Macedon
