= Barsine =

4th-century BC Persian/Greek noblewoman

- Born: 363 BC
- Died: c. 309 BC
- Known for: Mistress of Alexander the Great
- Spouses: Mentor of Rhodes; Memnon of Rhodes
- Children: At least 5, including Heracles of Macedon
- Father: Artabazos II

Barsine was half-Rhodian Greek by her mother, and half-Persian by her father, the satrap Artabazos II.

Claire Bloom as Barsine in the film Alexander the Great (1956)

Barsine (Greek: Βαρσίνη; c. 363–309 BC) was the daughter of a Persian father, Artabazus, satrap of Hellespontine Phrygia, and a Greek Rhodian mother, the sister of mercenaries Mentor of Rhodes and Memnon of Rhodes. Barsine became the wife of her uncle Mentor, and after his death married her second uncle, Memnon. She had by them at least 4 (possibly 5) children: three daughters by her first husband, as well as a son (and possibly an unnamed child), from the other union.

In 334 BC, the year of Alexander's invasion of Asia, she and her children were sent by Memnon to the king Darius III as hostages for his fidelity; and in the ensuing year, when Damascus was betrayed to the Macedonians, she fell into the hands of Alexander, by whom it is said that she became the mother of Heracles.

Around 310/309 BC Barsine's son-in-law Nearchus unsuccessfully advocated for Heracles' claim to the throne, who was by then 17 (according to Diodorus) or 15 (according to Justin), having been born between 327-324 BC. From a comparison of the accounts of Diodorus and Justin, it appears that he was brought up at Pergamum under his mother's care, and that she shared his fate when around 309 BC Polyperchon was induced by Cassander to murder him. Barsine is sometimes confused with Stateira II, wife of Alexander, who also may have been called "Barsine".

== See also ==
- Barsinia
