= Artabazos II =

4th-century BC Persian satrap of Hellespontine Phrygia

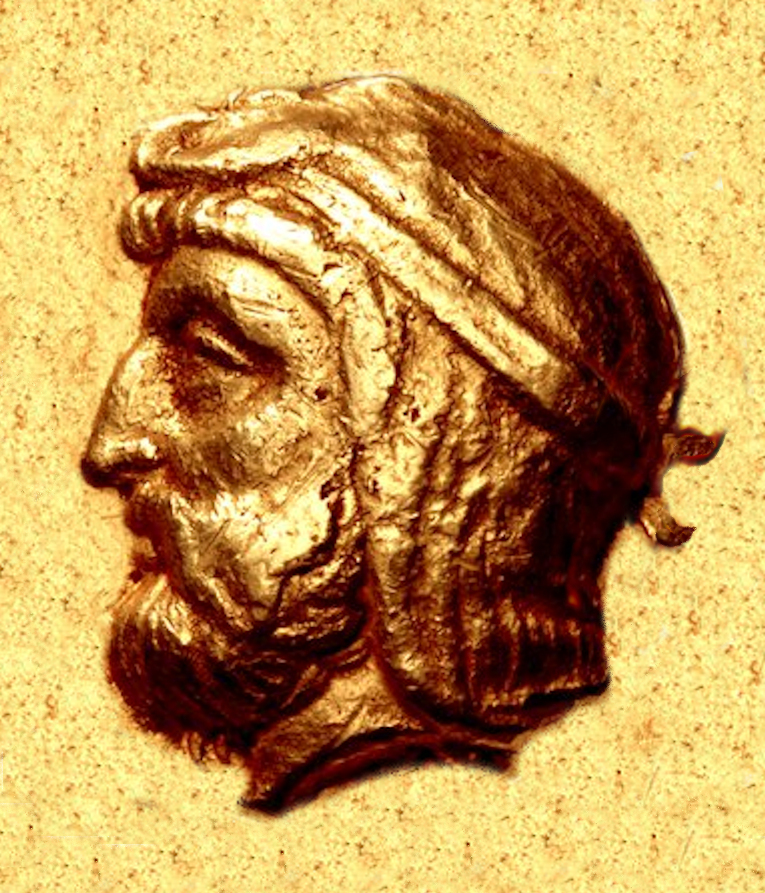
- Portrait of Artabazos II, from his gold coinage (fl. 389 – 328 BC).
- Died: 328 BC
- Children: Pharnabazus III; Artakama; Barsine
- Relatives: Pharnabazus II (father)
- Military career
- Allegiance: Achaemenid Empire
- Service years: fl. 389 – 328 BC
- Rank: Satrap of Hellespontine Phrygia; Satrap of Bactria (under Alexander the Great)
- Conflicts: Great Satraps' Revolt

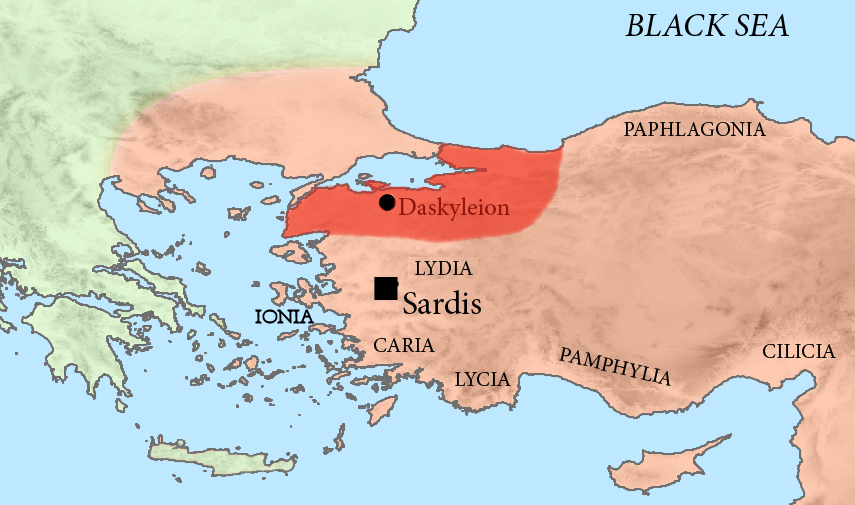
Artabazos II was Satrap of Hellespontine Phrygia, and ruled from its capital Daskyleion.

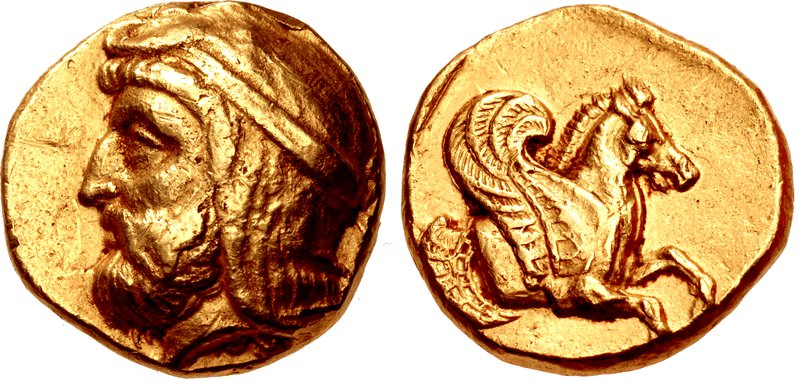
Coin of Artabazos. Satrap of Dascylium, Lampsakos, Mysia, circa 356 BC

Artabazos II (in Greek Ἀρτάβαζος) (fl. 389 – 328 BC) was a Persian general and satrap of Hellespontine Phrygia. He was the son of the Persian satrap of Hellespontine Phrygia Pharnabazus II, and younger kinsman (most probably nephew) of Ariobarzanes of Phrygia who revolted against Artaxerxes III around 356 BC. His first wife was an unnamed Greek woman from Rhodes, sister of the two mercenaries Mentor of Rhodes and Memnon of Rhodes. Towards the end of his life, he became satrap of Bactria for Alexander the Great.

== Revolt of Datames ==
In 362 BC, Artabazos was sent by Artaxerxes II to capture Datames, the satrap of Cappadocia, who had joined in the Satraps' revolt in which Artabazus' brother, Ariobarzanes, was a participant. However, Artabazos was defeated by Datames. Artaxerxes II ultimately prevailed, and Ariobarzanes was crucified and Datames assassinated.

== Rebellion against Artaxerxes III ==
Following the capture and death of his brother, Artabazos was made satrap of Hellespontine Phrygia, but in 356 BC he refused obedience to the new Persian king, Artaxerxes III. Artaxerxes had ordered the disbanding of all the satrapal armies of Asia Minor, as he felt that they could no longer guarantee peace in the west and was concerned that these armies equipped the western satraps with the means to revolt. The order was ignored by Artabazus, who asked for the help of Athens in a rebellion against the king. Artabazos then became involved in a revolt against the king and against other satraps who acknowledged the authority of Artaxerxes III.

Artabazos was at first supported by Chares, an Athenian general, and his mercenaries, whom he rewarded very generously. The gold coinage of Artabazos is thought to have been issued specifically to reward the troops of Chares. The Satrap of Mysia, Orontes I, was also on his side. Later, Artabazos was also supported by the Thebans, who sent him 5,000 men under Pammenes. With the assistance of these and other allies, Artabazos defeated the King in two great battles.

However, Artaxerxes III was later able to deprive Artabazos of his Athenian and Boeotian allies by counter-bribing them, whereupon Artabazos was defeated by the king's general, Autophradates, and was taken prisoner. Mentor and Memnon, two brothers-in-law of Artabazos, who had supported him, still continued the revolt, as they were aided by the Athenian mercenary leader, Charidemus. Together they were able to free Artabazos.

=== Exile in Macedonia at the court of Philip II (352–342 BC) ===
After this, Artabazos seems either to have continued his rebellious operations or at least started a fresh revolt. However, eventually, he had no choice but to flee with Memnon and his family. They went into exile and took refuge at the court of Philip II of Macedonia in Pella, together with their 11 sons and 10 daughters. Artabazos, who was 37, and his family were exiled at the court of Philip II for about ten years, from 352 to 342, and during that time Artabazos became acquainted with the future Alexander the Great. Barsine, daughter of Artabazos, and future wife of Alexander, grew up at the Macedonian court.

== Return to Persia ==
During the absence of Artabazos, Mentor of Rhodes, his brother-in-law, was of great service to the king of Persia in his war against Nectanebo II of Egypt. After the close of this war, in the summer of 342 BC, Artaxerxes gave Mentor the command against the rebellious satraps of western Asia. Mentor took advantage of this opportunity to ask the king to grant a pardon to Artabazos and Memnon. The king agreed and both men and their families were able to return to Persia.

=== Hellenistic satrap of Bactria ===
After the final defeat and death of Darius III in 330 BC, Alexander recognised and rewarded Artabazos for his loyalty to the Persian king by giving him the satrapy of Bactria, a post he held until his death in 328 BC.

== Family ==
Artabazos' daughter, Barsine, may have married Alexander and may have been the mother of Heracles. Another daughter, Artacama, was given in marriage to Ptolemy; and a third daughter, Artonis, was given in marriage to Eumenes.

For Barsine, the daughter of Artabazus, who was the first lady Alexander took to his bed in Asia, and who brought him a son named Heracles, had two sisters; one of which, called Apame, he gave to Ptolemy; and the other, called Artonis, he gave to Eumenes, at the time when he was selecting Persian ladies as wives for his friends.

— Plutarch, The Life of Eumenes.

In 328 BC, Artabazos resigned his satrapy, which was given to Cleitus the Black.

Artabazos also had a son named Pharnabazus (fl. 370–320 BC).

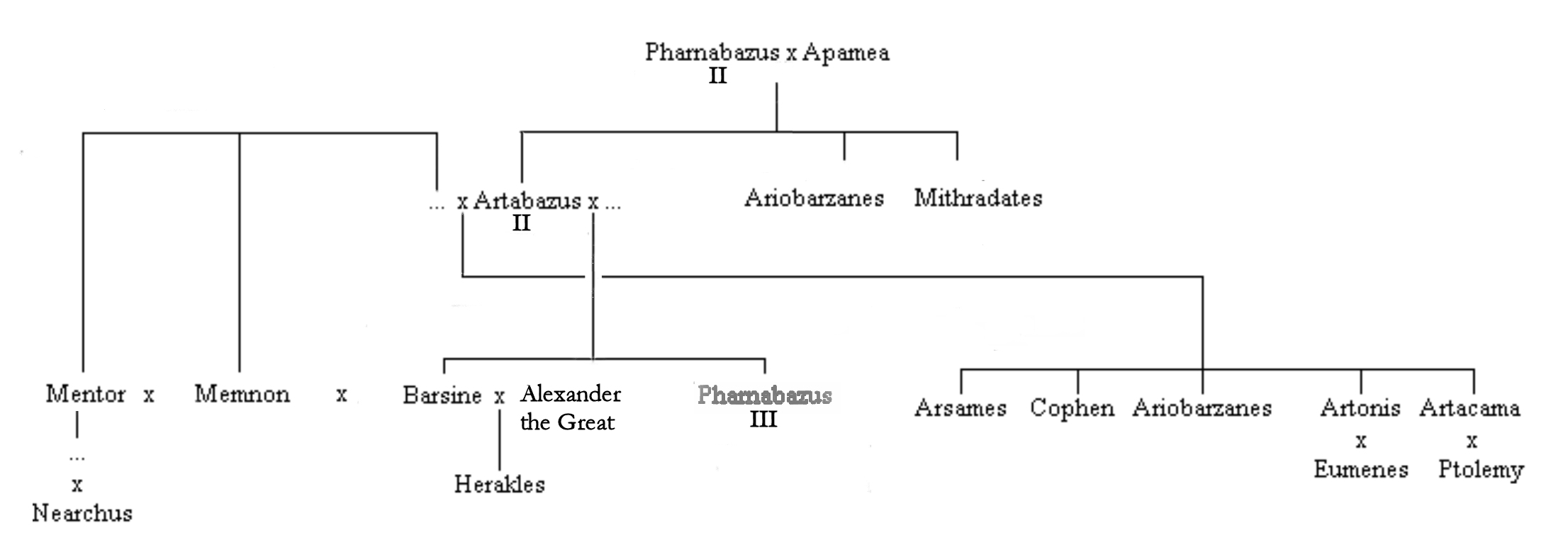
Family tree of the later Pharnacids.
