= Spitamenes =

Sogdian warlord (370–328 BCE)

- Born: 370 BC
- Died: 328 BC (aged c. 42)
- Conflicts: Wars of Alexander the Great
- Children: Apama

Spitamenes (Old Persian Spitamana; Greek Σπιταμένης; 370 BC – 328 BC) was a Sogdian warlord and the leader of the uprising in Sogdiana and Bactria against Alexander the Great, King of Macedon, in 329 BC. He has been credited by modern historians as one of the most tenacious adversaries of Alexander.

== Biography ==
Spitamenes was an ally of Bessus. In 329 BC, Bessus stirred a revolt in the eastern satrapies, and the same year his allies began to be uncertain about supporting him. Alexander went with his army to Drapsaca, outflanked Bessus and sent him fleeing. Bessus was then removed from power by Spitamenes, and Ptolemy was sent to catch him.

While Alexander was founding the new city of Alexandria Eschate on the Jaxartes river, news came that Spitamenes had roused Sogdiana against him and was besieging the Macedonian garrison in Markanda. Too occupied at that time to personally lead an army against Spitamenes, Alexander sent an army under the command of Pharnuches which was promptly annihilated with a loss of no less than 2,000 infantry and 300 cavalry.

The uprising now posed a direct threat to his army, and Alexander moved personally to relieve Markanda, only to learn that Spitamenes had left Sogdiana and was attacking Bactria, from where he was repulsed with great difficulty by the satrap of Bactria, Artabazos II (328 BC).

The turning point came in December 328 BC when Spitamenes was defeated by Alexander's general Coenus at the Battle of Gabai. Spitamenes was killed by some treacherous nomadic tribal leaders and they sent his head to Alexander, suing for peace.

Spitamenes had a daughter, Apama, who was married to one of Alexander's most important generals and an eventual Diadochos, Seleucus I Nicator (February 324 BC). The couple had a son, Antiochus I Soter, a future ruler of the Seleucid Empire. Several towns were named Apamea in her honour.

== Sources ==
- Heckel, Waldemar (2006). Who's Who in the Age of Alexander the Great: Prosopography of Alexander's Empire. Blackwell Publishing.
- Heckel, Waldemar (2020). In the Path of Conquest: Resistance to Alexander the Great. Oxford University Press. ISBN 978-0-19-007668-9.
