= The Family of Darius Before Alexander =

Painting by Paolo Veronese

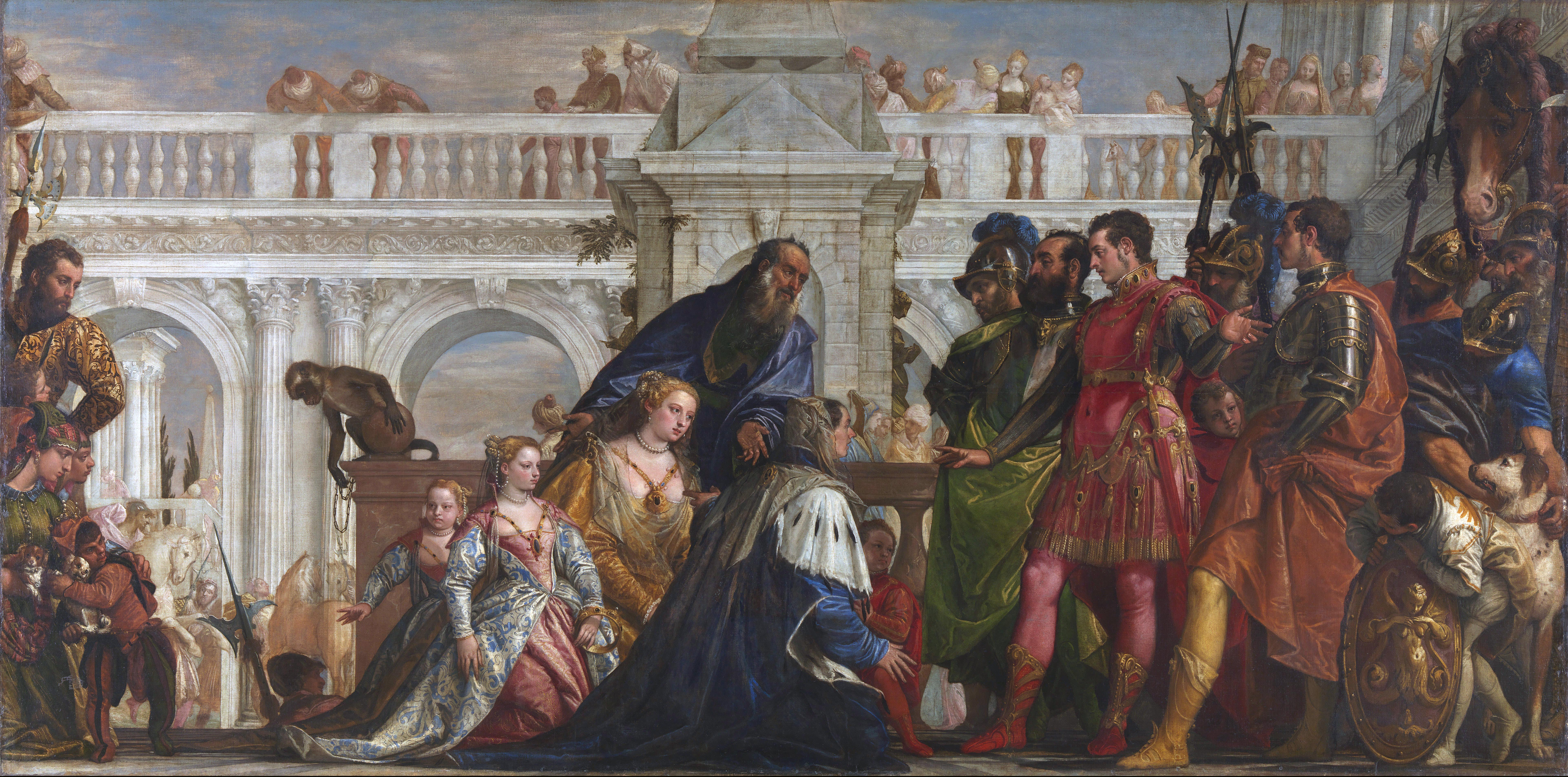
- Artist: Paolo Veronese
- Year: 1565–1570
- Medium: oil on canvas
- Dimensions: 236.2 cm × 475.9 cm (93.0 in × 187.4 in)
- Location: National Gallery, London

The Family of Darius Before Alexander is an oil painting on canvas by Paolo Veronese, executed c. 1565–1570. It depicts Alexander the Great with the family of Darius III, the Persian king he had defeated in battle. Although Veronese had previously painted a version of the subject, since destroyed, the theme had rarely been depicted by other artists before him. The painting has been in the collection of the National Gallery in London since 1857.

== Narrative ==
In 333 BC Alexander defeated Darius III, the last king of the Achaemenid Empire, at the Battle of Issus. Darius escaped capture, but his wife Stateira I, his mother, Sisygambis, and his daughters Stateira II and Drypetis were taken by Alexander. Alexander displayed forgiveness in victory. According to Plutarch:

[He] gave them leave to bury whom they pleased of the Persians, and to make use for this purpose what garments and furniture they thought fit out of the booty. He diminished nothing of their equipage, or of the attentions and respect formerly paid them, and allowed larger pensions for their maintenance than they had before. But the noblest and most royal part of their usage was, that he treated these illustrious prisoners according to their virtue and character.

Although Darius's wife was renowned for her beauty, "Alexander, esteeming it more kingly to govern himself than to conquer his enemies, sought no intimacy with any of them." The painting focuses on a misunderstanding involving Sisygambis, Darius's mother, which was not mentioned by Plutarch, but was recounted by several late Classical writers, among them Arrian, Valerius Maximus and Quintus Curtius Rufus. According to Quintus Curtius's History of Alexander the Great, Alexander went to the women's tent accompanied only by Hephaestion, counsellor to the king and his intimate friend since the two had been children. Sisygambis mistook the taller Hephaestion for Alexander, and knelt before him to plead for mercy. When her error was realized, Alexander magnanimously said that Hephaestion, too, was Alexander; this assuaged Sisygambis's embarrassment over her confusion, and served as a compliment to his friend.

== Painting ==
The composition preserves this ambiguity, and reflects the confusion of Sisygambis. Generally the scholarship is in agreement that Alexander is the young man in red, who gestures as if in the act of speaking while referring to Hephaestion at his left, though some historians dispute that interpretation and reverse the two figures' identities. The continued uncertainty as to their correct identification is taken as evidence of Veronese's "pictorial intelligence".

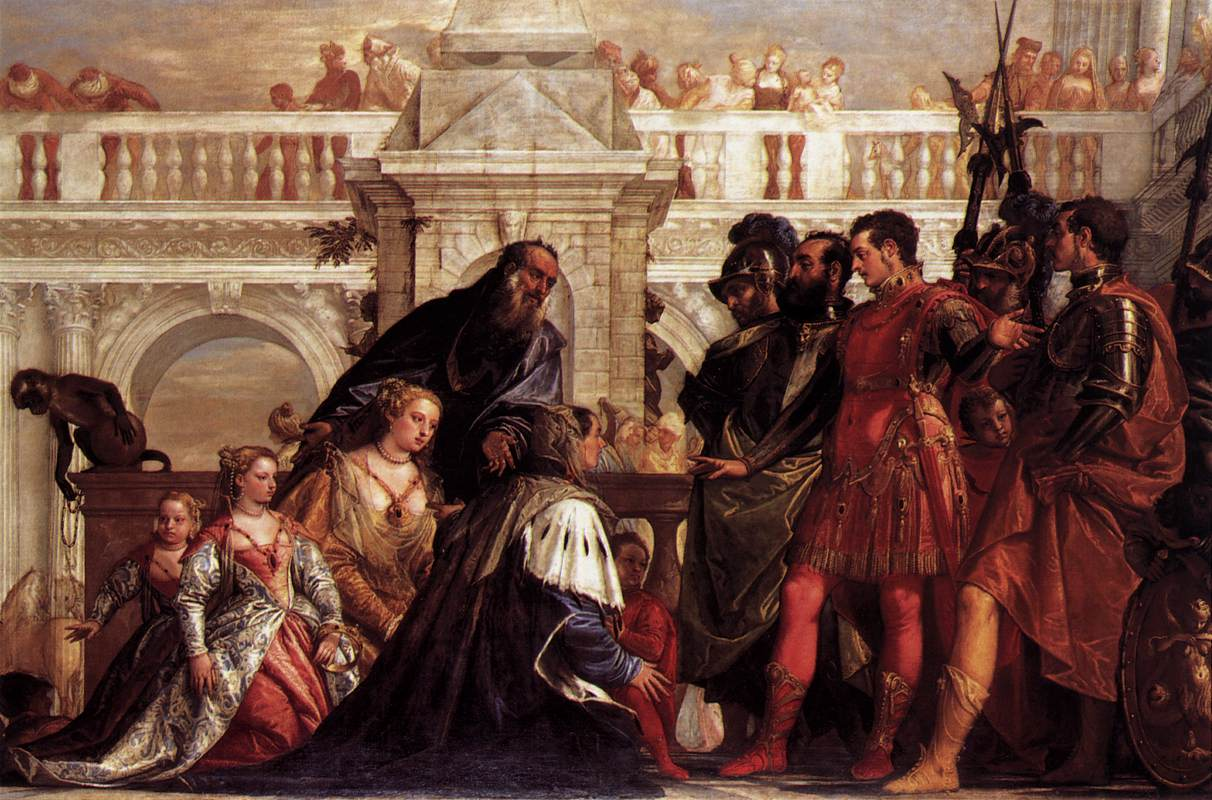
Detail of the central groups, with the family of Darius being presented to Alexander and Hephaestion

While honouring the spirit of the story, Veronese took liberties with his interpretation of the narrative, which in the painting occurs in a palatial hall, not a tent. The splendid wardrobe is that of the Venice in which Veronese lived, rather than ancient Greece or the Far East. It has long been supposed that Veronese inserted portraits of his contemporaries into the painting, as was customary in Venetian history painting. While it has been suggested that the figures were modelled after members of the Pisani family, for whose estate the picture was made, it has alternatively been proposed that the kneeling girls are Veronese's daughters, and the courtier who presents them is the artist's self-portrait. Another interpretation has Veronese appearing in the form of the man standing behind Alexander, while it has been suggested that it is the patron, Francesco Pisani, who presents the family to Alexander. The art historian Nicholas Penny has written that the painting's characterizations of cultivated nobility were based on no particular models, and were products of the artist's imagination.

The picture's theatrical design places the most prominent figures in a shallow foreground stage. Immediately behind them are a diverting company of pages, halberdiers, dwarfs, dogs and monkeys, and in the further distance looms an architectural screen, an arched promenade parallel to the picture plane and supporting more spectators. These are pictorial preferences typical of Veronese, with the placement of figures and edifices reinforcing a processional character. The curves of the distant arches echo the movement of the supplicant figures in the foreground, while the gesture of Sisygambis corresponds to and is reinforced by the verticals of the central fountain; the architectural geometry organizes the movement of the figures.

Analysis of the canvas has shown that it was of a type favoured by Veronese, with an arrangement of threads creating a diagonal twill pattern. While he often preferred to paint on lightly coloured grounds, for The Family of Darius Before Alexander, as with many of his larger paintings, Veronese prepared the canvas only with plain gesso. Though he routinely made numerous preparatory sketches, Veronese made major revisions while working on The Family of Darius Before Alexander, including painting out a balcony with figures directly behind the main group, and adding lightly sketched horses and figures to the left background, perhaps as an afterthought.

== Provenance and assessment ==
The Family of Darius Before Alexander was the only painting mentioned by Johann Wolfgang von Goethe in the account of his 1786 visit to Venice. He admired the painting during his stay at the Palazzo Pisani Moretta, and repeated the legend that the picture was painted by Veronese in gratitude for the hospitality of the Pisani. Supposedly the enormous canvas was painted at the villa in secret, and rolled up and left under a bed when the artist departed; the account has since been regarded as fanciful.

According to recent scholarship, the painting was first owned by Francesco Pisani, and was housed at the Villa Pisani in Montagnana, a building designed by Palladio. The canvas was probably moved to Venice after 1629, when the Pisani family purchased a palace on the Grand Canal. It was so esteemed that in 1664 agents of Queen Christina of Sweden attempted to negotiate its purchase with the Venetian ambassador to Rome. The asking price of 5,000 ducats was considered excessive, and effectively discouraged all prospective buyers. As a result, copies of the painting were in demand, one of which was valued by its owner at 80 ducats.

Charles Lock Eastlake, the director of the National Gallery, examined the painting in Venice on 14 October 1856. At a time when the British Empire would have found the painting's idealizations reflective of its presumptions, and after four years of negotiations, the museum bought the painting for 13,650 pounds. The price was thought exorbitant, and in July 1857 the purchase was debated in the House of Commons, when Lord Elcho attacked the painting as a "second-rate specimen".

John Ruskin called it "the most precious Paul Veronese in the world". Henry James wrote in 1882:

You may walk out of the noon-day dusk of Trafalgar Square in November, and in one of the chambers of the National Gallery see the family of Darius rustling and pleading and weeping at the feet of Alexander. Alexander is a beautiful young Venetian in crimson pantaloons, and the picture sends a glow into the cold London twilight.

== Notes ==
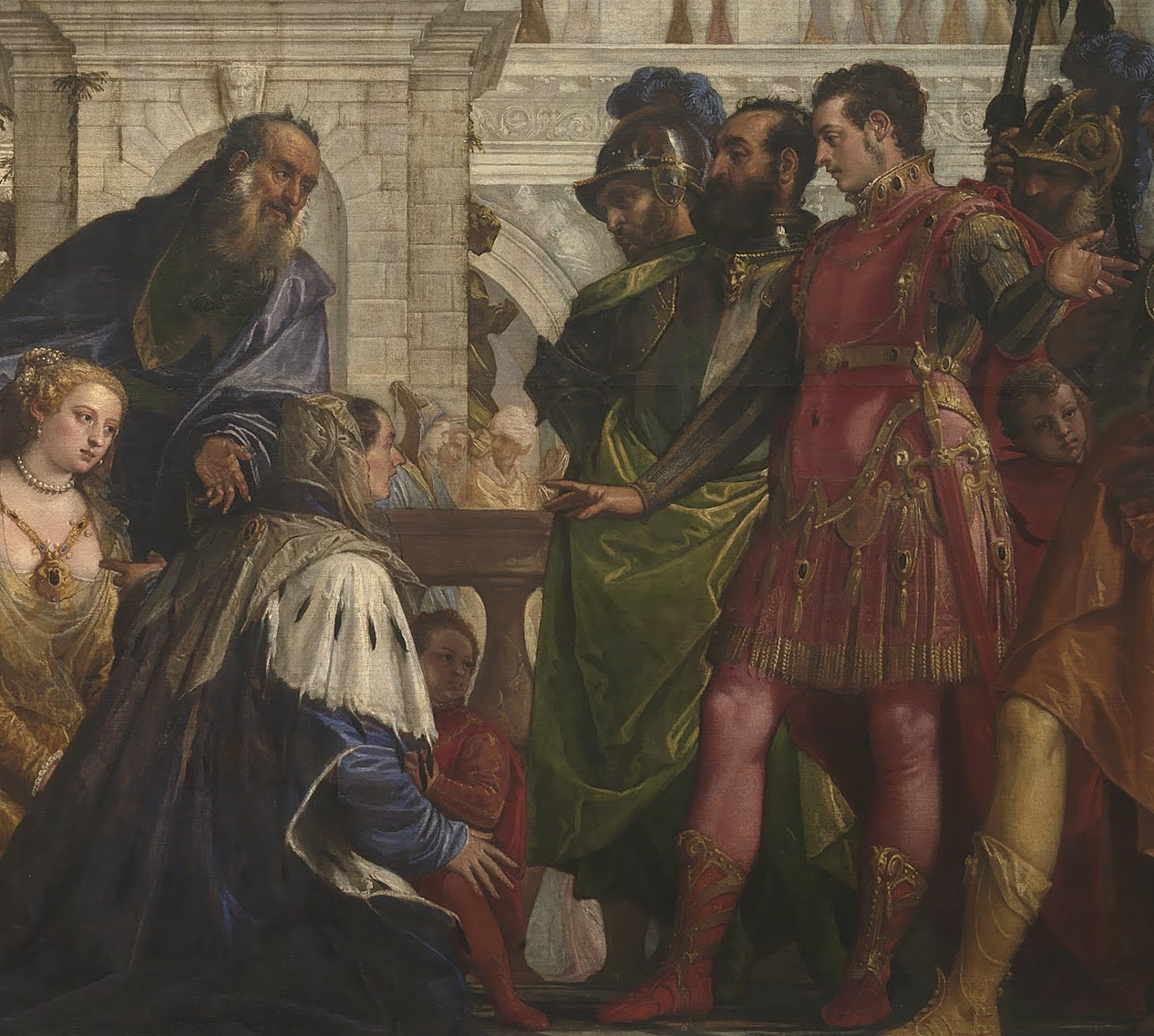

External media

Audio
- The homoeroticism of Veronese's painting

Video
- Veronese's The Family of Darius Before Alexander
