= Achaemenid Sogdia =

Sogdia Suguda
- Satrapy of the Achaemenid Empire
- c. 540 BC–330 BC
- Capital: Marakanda (?)
- Historical era: Antiquity
  - Conquest by Cyrus the Great: c. 540 BC
  - Conquest by Alexander the Great: 330 BC
Succeeded by
Macedonian Empire

Sogdia (Old Persian: 𐎿𐎢𐎦𐎢𐎭, romanized: Suguda) was a satrapy of the Achaemenid Empire from c. 540 BC to 330 BC. It was seemingly part of the administration of Bactria, though the extent of Bactrian satrapal control over Sogdia remains unclear.

== Geography and centers ==
Sogdia was an Iranian-speaking region in Central Asia, which during this period extended from the Amu Darya in the south to the Syr Darya in the north.

Sogdia functioned as a frontier zone that interacted heavily with the networks of High-mountain Asia and steppes past the Syr Darya. The main population centers were located along the middle sections of the Zerafshan (in the city of Marakanda) and Kashka Darya (in the cities of Xenippa, Nautaca and Kitob) rivers. Smaller but notable populations raised livestock while moving between the lower Zerafshan and the Middle Syr Darya.

The Achaemenid period likely saw the construction of the first major fortifications in Marakanda. The satrapal headquarters of Sogdia may have been located there, as a "royal residence" was mentioned to have existed at the site.

Prisoners of war and exiles from the western part of the empire were seemingly often relocated to eastern Iranian satrapies, particularly Bactria and Sogdia, such as the banishment of the Branchidae from Miletus to Sogdia.

== History ==
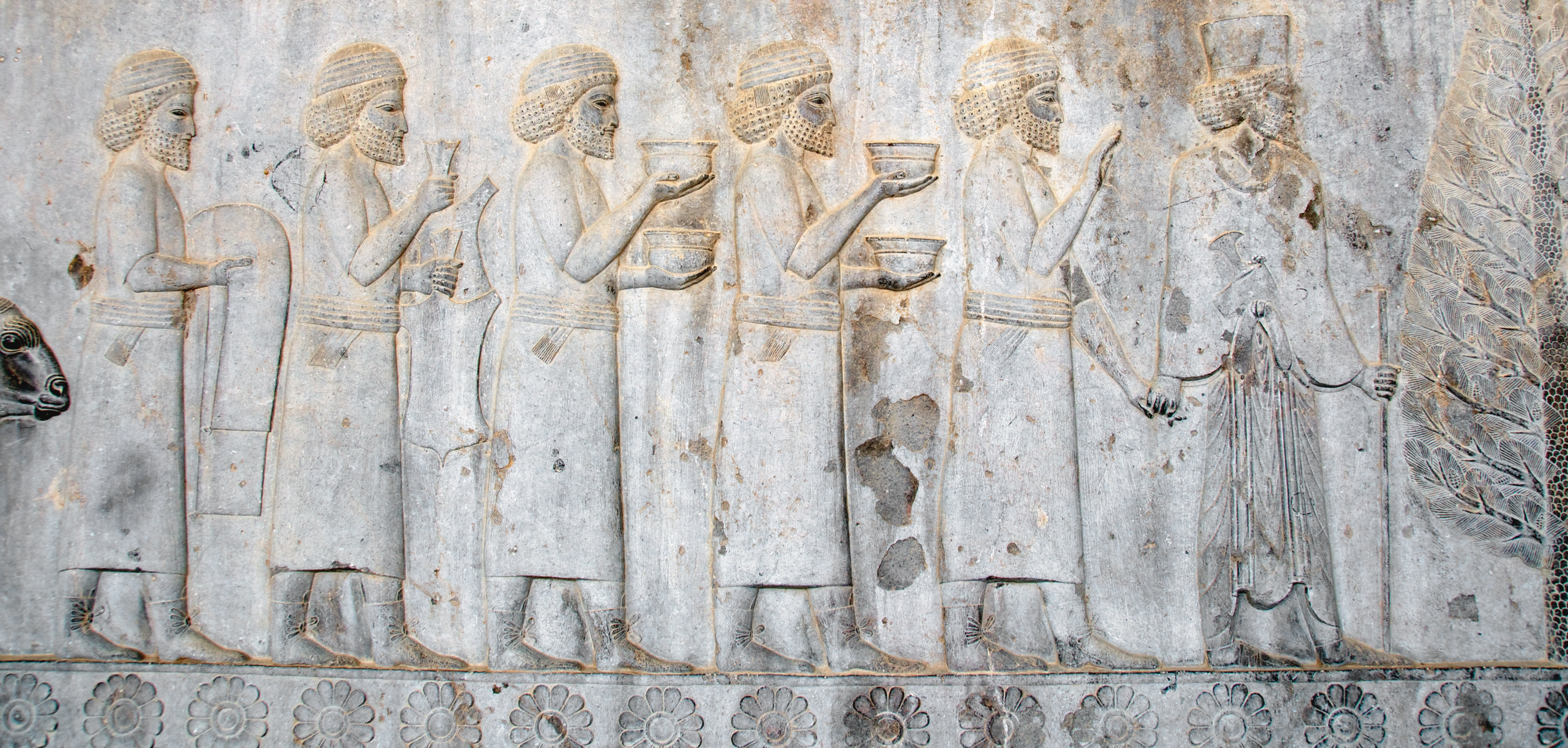
Sogdians on a Achaemenid relief from the Apadana of Persepolis, offering tributary gifts to the King of Kings Darius I, 5th century BC

The Zoroastrian holy book Avesta highlights the importance of Sogdia to early Iranian civilization, listing it among the good lands the Zoroastrian supreme god Ahura Mazda created, second only to Airyanem Vaejah, the legendary homeland of the Iranians. Sogdia was conquered in c. 540 BC by the Achaemenid ruler Cyrus the Great (r. 550–530 BC), where he founded the city of Cyropolis. Sogdia is mentioned amongst the satrapies of the Achaemenid Empire in the inscriptions of Darius the Great (r. 522–486 BC) at Behistun, Persepolis, and Naqsh-e Rostam. Wall carvings at Persepolis depict the Achaemenid king receiving gifts from Sogdians. Additionally, troops from Sogdia fought in the Achaemenid military under Darius I's son and successor Xerxes I (r. 486–465 BC).

During the reign of Darius III (r. 336–330 BC), Bessus was made the satrap of Bactria. As the satrap of Bactria, he was able to exert his rule over Sogdia to the north, and regions that bordered India. He managed to retain the loyalty of the Iranian nomadic groups in Central Asia, the Saka, the Dahae and the Massagetae. According to the Iranologist Richard Foltz, the eastern satrapies were practically Bessus' personal domain.

In 330 BC, Darius III was murdered by Bessus and his co-conspirators. In the autumn of 330 BC, Bessus declared himself the new ruler of the Achaemenid Empire, assuming the royal name of Artaxerxes V. There he attempted to hold the eastern part of the empire against Alexander the Great (r. 336 – 323 BC).

In spring 329 BBC, Bessus withdrew to the north of the Amu Darya, where attempted to gain the help of Sogdians, the Choresmians, and the "Scythians dwelling beyond the river Tanais". However, he was soon deserted by his most important troops, and then at Nautaca he was arrested by his own Sogdian officers, who gave him to Alexander. Bessus was subsequently executed, and two and half years later, Sogdia and Bactria was more or less under the authority of Alexander.

== Administration ==
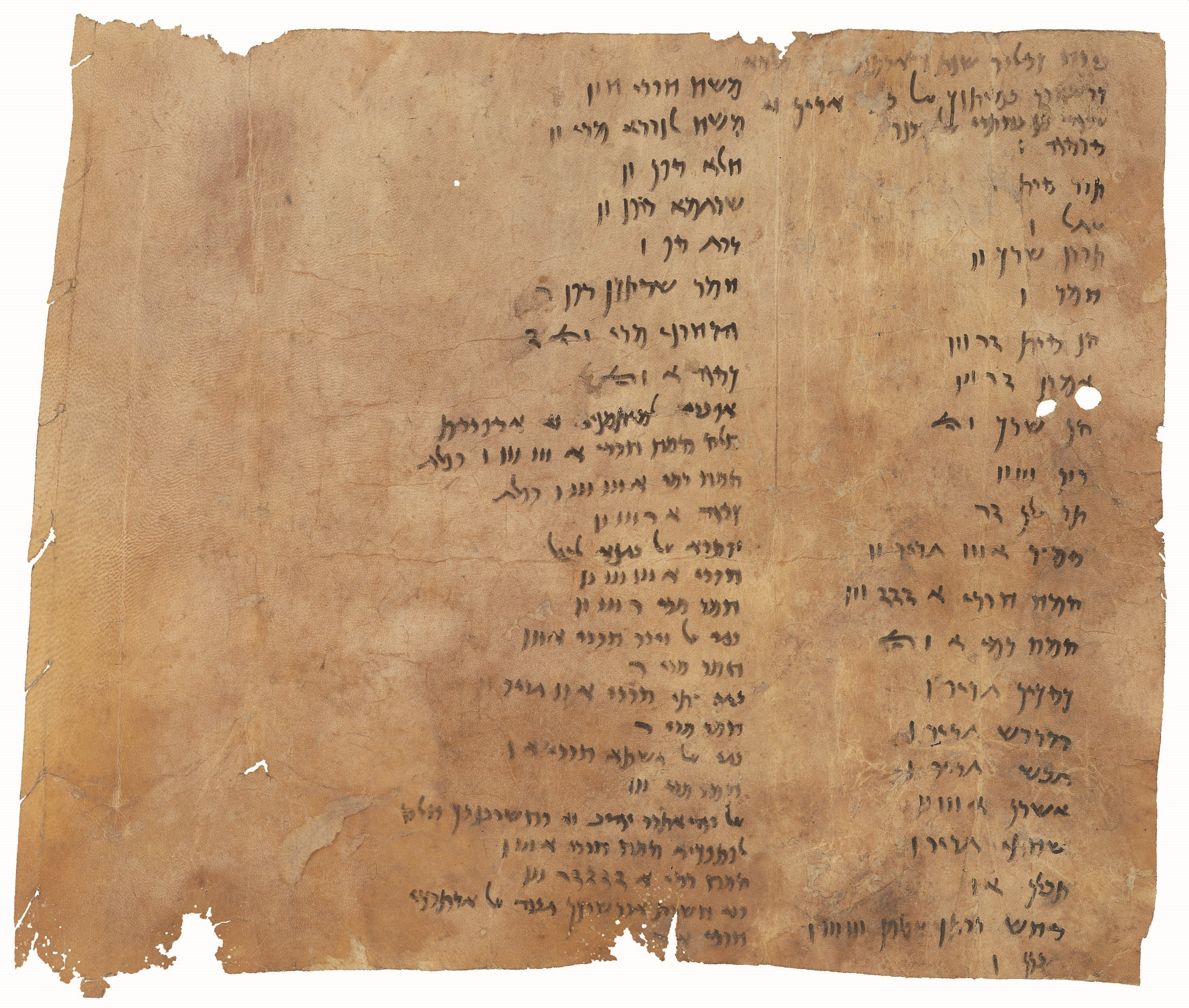
List of supplies for Bessus, November–December 330 BC, from a collection of Achaemenid administrative documents written in Aramaic

Sogdia was seemingly part of the administration of Bactria. During the reign of Darius III, the satrap of Bactria led the Sogdian contingents at the Battle of Gaugamela, which indicates he during that period at least had some authority over the military in Sogdia. He likely played a role in delivering central government tributes, which comprised workers and possibly rare minerals such as carnelian and lapis lazuli. Nevertheless, the extent of his control over Sogdia remains unclear. The satrap of Bactria possibly held firm authority in Sogdia according to recent Aramaic documents, though the historians Naveh and Shaked reject that conclusion.

Records covering the wars of Alexander the Great during and right after Darius III's reign provide unique information on the geography, ethnic makeup, and Achaemenid governance of the eastern Iranian satrapies. These accounts document semi-autonomous tribes in the mountainous areas and powerful local elites (referred to as "hyparchs" by the Greeks), whose strong resistance in Bactria and Sogdia dragged Alexander in a drawn-out guerilla war. Sogdia's many inhabitants, fertile farmland, and fortified bases formed the foundation of power for local aristocratic families, who played a significant role and could also call upon nomadic warrior allies.

== Sources ==
- Foltz, Richard (2019). A History of the Tajiks: Iranians of the East. New York: Bloomsbury Publishing. ISBN 978-1784539559.
- Kia, Mehrdad (2016). The Persian Empire: A Historical Encyclopedia [2 volumes]. ABC-CLIO. ISBN 978-1610693912.
- Kuhrt, Amélie; Sancisi-Weerdenburg, Helen (2006). "Bessus". In Salazar, Christine F.; Landfester, Manfred; Gentry, Francis G. (eds.). Brill's New Pauly. Brill Online.
- Stark, Sören (2021). "The Iranian East". In Jacobs, Bruno; Rollinger, Robert (eds.). A Companion to the Achaemenid Persian Empire. John Wiley & Sons. pp. 695–710. ISBN 978-1119174288.
- la Vaissière, Étienne de (2011). "Sogdiana iii. History and Archaeology". In Yarshater, Ehsan (ed.). Encyclopædia Iranica (Online ed.). Encyclopædia Iranica Foundation. ISBN 978-1934283295.
- Weiskopf, Michael (1989). "Bessos". In Yarshater, Ehsan (ed.). Encyclopædia Iranica (Online ed.). Encyclopædia Iranica Foundation. ISBN 978-0710091277.
