= Bactria (disambiguation) =

Bactria was an ancient region of Central Asia centred on the city of Balk (Bactra) in present-day Afghanistan.

Bactria may also refer to:

- Bactria (satrapy), administrative division of the Achaemenid Empire covering the region
- Bactria (fly), a genus of insects in the family Asilidae
- Bactria (plant), a genus of plants in the family Polygonaceae

== See also ==
- Bactrian (disambiguation)
- Balkh (disambiguation)
- Bahlika (disambiguation), Sanskrit name of the region
- Daxia (disambiguation), Chinese name of the region
- Bactra (moth), a moth genus
