= Bessus =

Achaemenid satrap and pretender to throne (died 329 BC)

Artaxerxes V Bessus 𐎠𐎼𐎫𐎧𐏁𐏂𐎠
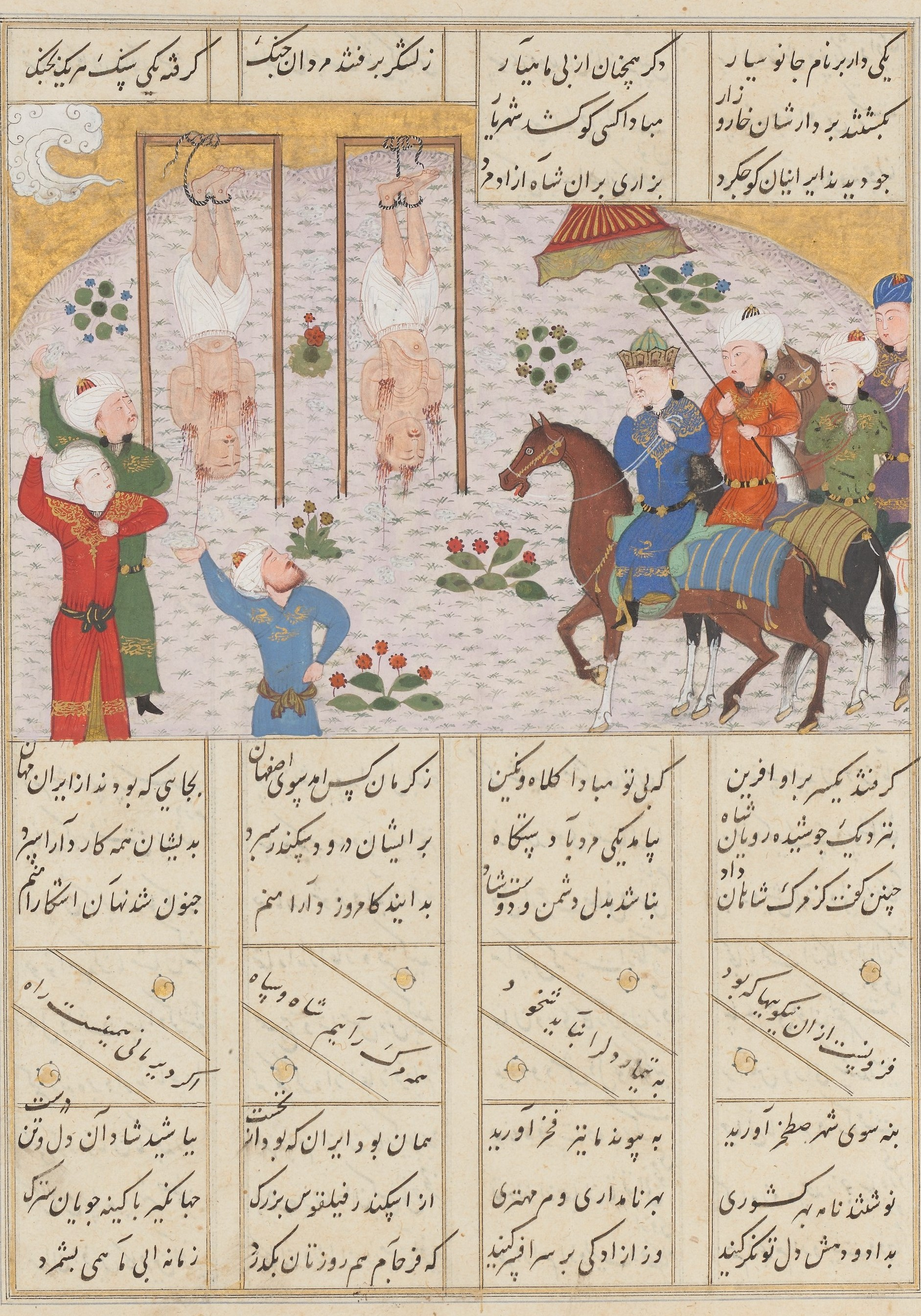
- "Alexander executes Janushyar and Mahiyar, the slayers of Darius." Folio from a manuscript of Ferdowsi's Shahnameh ("Book of Kings"), created in Shiraz, dated 1482.

King of Kings of the Achaemenid Empire
- Reign: 330–329 BC
- Predecessor: Darius III
- Successor: Alexander the Great (Macedonian Empire)
- Died: 329 BC; Ecbatana
- Dynasty: Achaemenid dynasty
- Religion: Zoroastrianism

Bessus or Bessos (Old Persian: *Bayaçā; Ancient Greek: Βήσσος), also known by his regnal name Artaxerxes V (Old Persian: 𐎠𐎼𐎫𐎧𐏁𐏂𐎠 Artaxšaçāʰ; Ancient Greek: Ἀρταξέρξης; died summer 329 BC), was a Persian satrap of the eastern Achaemenid satrapy of Bactria, as well as the self-proclaimed King of Kings of the Achaemenid Empire from 330 to 329 BC.

A member of the ruling Achaemenid dynasty, Bessus came to power shortly after killing the legitimate Achaemenid ruler Darius III (r. 336–330 BC), and subsequently attempted to hold the eastern part of the empire against the Greek Macedonian king Alexander the Great (r. 336–323 BC). His realm quickly started to fall apart, including Bactria, which was the main center. Fleeing to Sogdia, he was arrested by his own men, who handed him over to Alexander, who had him executed at Ecbatana.

Bessus appears in the 11th-century Persian epic Shahnameh under the name of Janusipar/Janushyar.

== Name ==
"Bessus" (Βήσσος) is the Greek transliteration of the Old Persian name *Bayaçā ("protecting from fear"). Artaxerxes is the Latin form of the Greek Artaxérxes (Αρταξέρξης), itself from the Old Persian Artaxšaçā (𐎠𐎼𐎫𐎧𐏁𐏂𐎠, "whose reign is through truth"). It is known in other languages as; Elamite Ir-tak-ik-ša-iš-ša, Ir-da-ik-ša-iš-ša; Akkadian Ar-ta-ʾ-ḫa-šá-is-su; Middle Persian and New Persian Ardašīr.

== Career ==
Nothing is known about the background of Bessus, except that he belonged to the ruling Achaemenid dynasty. During the reign of the King of Kings Darius III (r. 336–330 BC), Bessus was made the satrap of Bactria, an important satrapy in the eastern part of the empire. Bactria, which had been under Achaemenid rule since 545–540 BC, was prosperous and populous. As shown by archaeological findings, agriculture, trade, commerce and handicraft thrived in the area. The office of satrap of Bactria seems to have occasionally been equivalent to a "vice-king of the east" type of position.

As the satrap of Bactria, Bessus was able to exert his rule over Sogdia to the north, and regions that bordered India. He managed to retain the loyalty of the Iranian nomadic groups in Central Asia, the Saka, the Dahae and the Massagetae. According to the Iranologist Richard Foltz, the eastern satrapies were practically Bessus' personal domain. Following the Persian defeat at the Battle of Issus against the Macedonian king Alexander the Great (r. 336–323 BC) in 333 BC, Darius III summoned Bessus to aid him.

Bessus later took part in the Battle of Gaugamela against Alexander in 331 BC, where he supplied Darius III with a contingent composed of Bactrians, Sogdians, Indians, as well as his Saka allies. He led the cavalry on the left wing of the Persian forces, with the intention of crippling Alexander's attack on that flank. Following the Persian defeat at the battle, Bessus followed Darius III in his flight to the city of Ecbatana in Media. There Bessus conspired against Darius III with other Persian grandees, such as the chiliarch Nabarzanes, and Barsaentes, the satrap of Arachosia–Drangiana. Together they arrested Darius III in mid-330 BC, with Bessus being chosen as the leader of the Achaemenid forces, probably due to his Achaemenid descent. The arrest of Darius III gave Alexander the pretext of avenging him. Fleeing from the pursuing Macedonian forces, Bessus and the rebels carried Darius III in a covered wagon, reportedly in golden chains. In order to buy some time for their escape, Bessus and his co-conspirators killed Darius III and left his body by the road. The murder took place near Hecatompylus, in July 330 BC. Darius III's body was later found by Alexander, who had him buried in the royal crypt in Persepolis.

== Reign ==
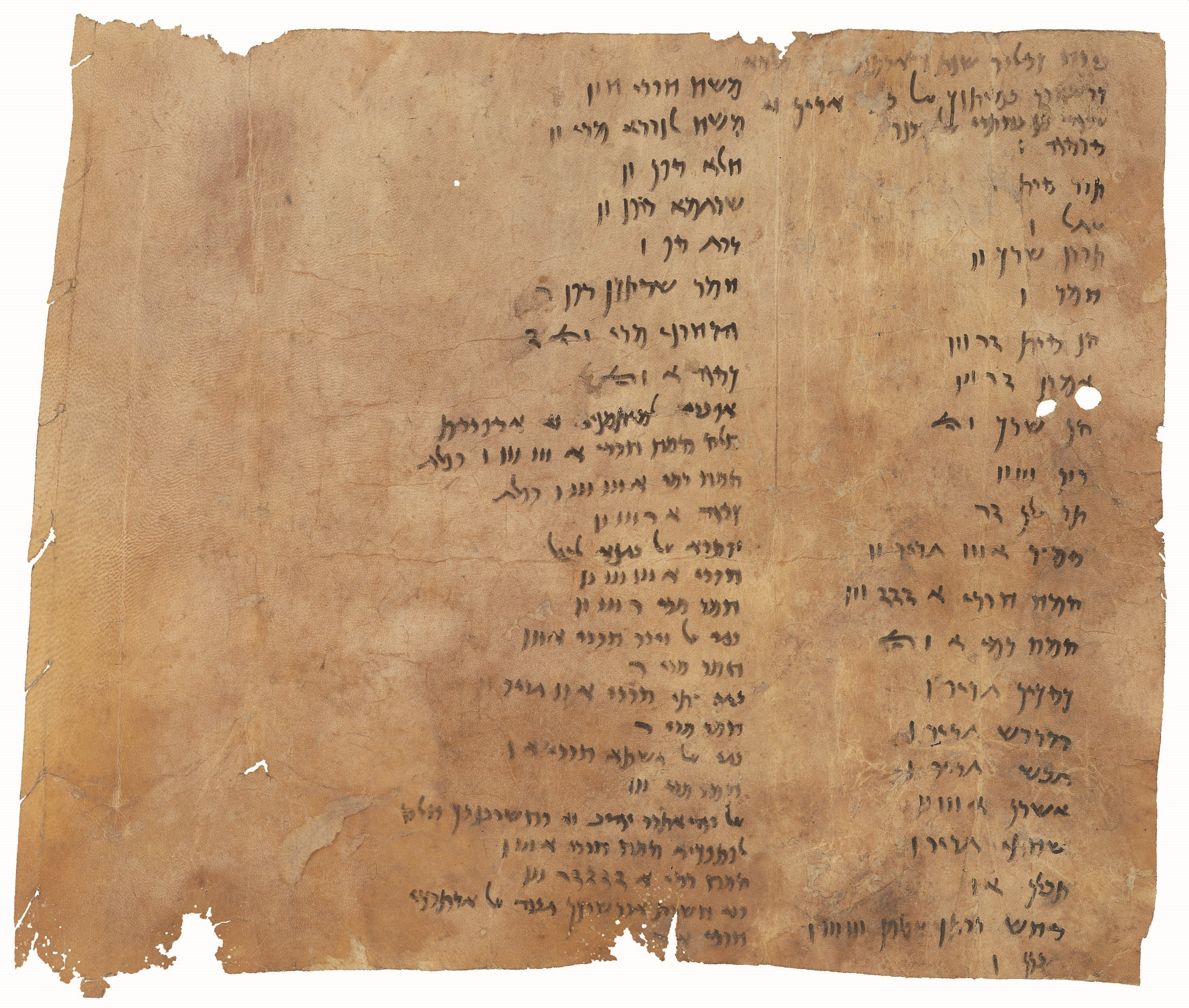
List of supplies for Bessus, November–December 330 BC, from a collection of Achaemenid administrative documents

In the autumn of 330, at the Bactrian capital of Bactra, Bessus declared himself King of Kings of the Achaemenid Empire, assuming the royal name of Artaxerxes V. There he attempted to hold the eastern part of the empire against Alexander. His domain encompassed Bactria, the main center; Sogdia, administered by officers such as Spitamenes and Oxyartes; the nomadic Iranian tribes of Central Asia; Aria, governed by the satrap Satibarzanes, who had initially surrendered to Alexander; Arachosia-Drangiana, governed by Barsaentes; Parthia and Hyrcania, governed by Nabarazanes following his appointment by Bessus; and western India. Bessus' usurpation and the invigorated resistance in Central Asia created a new problem for the Macedonians. If they failed to confront Bessus, his usurpation could be seen as change in government, thus rendering Darius III's death irrelevant. However, Bessus' empire quickly started to fall apart; Nabarzanes, accepting his hopeless position, surrendered to Alexander and was pardoned with the help of Bagoas. Satibarzanes was defeated and killed by the Macedonian forces in 329 BC, before Bessus was able to help him. Around the same time, Barsaentes fled to India to escape the Macedonian forces.

According to the 1st-century BC Greek historian Diodorus Siculus (died 30 BC), Bessus had plans to defend Bactria, and urged its inhabitants to fight for their independence. He was able to muster a satrapal levy of 8,000 Bactrians, seemingly the remnants of the troops that had fought under him at Gaugamela. However, many of those soldiers dispersed after receiving news that Alexander had crossed the Hindu Kush. Instead of making a stand, Bessus fled into Sogdia by crossing the Oxus, where he hoped to obtain aid from the Sogdians, the Chorasmians, and the "Scythians dwelling beyond the river Tanais". His flight from Bactria alienated many of his Bactrian supporters. The Canadian historian Waldemar Heckel suggests that Bessus may have in reality not been particularly popular, and adds that his most prominent supporters had either been killed or fled. The hyparchs and local dynasts of Bactria-Sogdiana now realized that they were isolated, and so a victory – at least a great one – was unlikely.

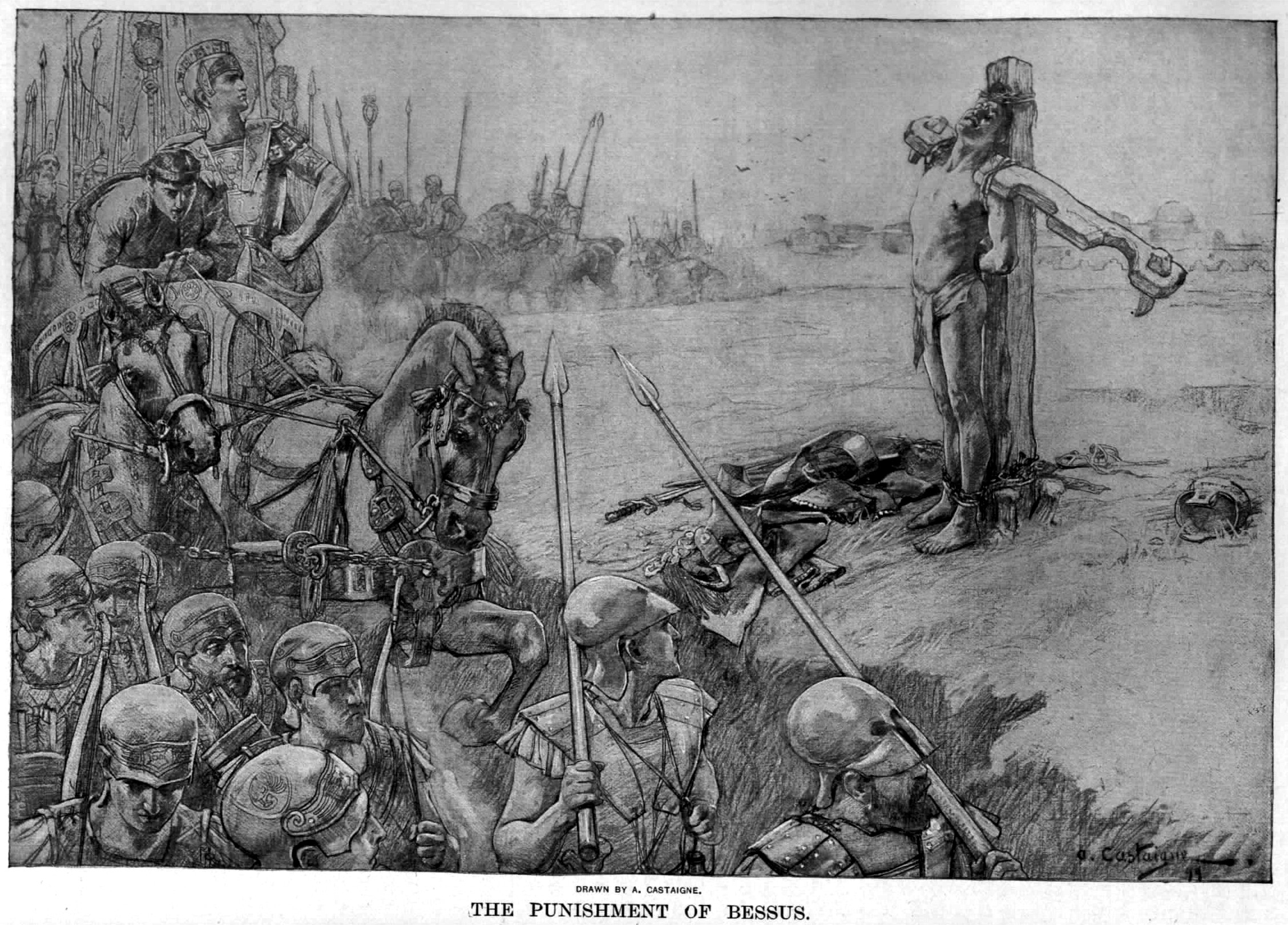
The Punishment of Bessus (André Castaigne, 1899)

Alexander, since his victory at Gaugamela, had behaved in the same manner as a sovereign ruler, and had been on several occasions afterwards acknowledged as the "King of Asia." His actions indicated that he planned to continue the administrative system of the Achaemenid Empire, which meant that the local leaders in Central Asia would be allowed to maintain their authority. Furthermore, Alexander had not only pardoned many of his former opponents, but had also restored them to their former satrapies. Thus, the indigenous rulers now regarded Bessus as being a threat to their continued security. At Nautaca (present-day Shahrisabz) Bessus was arrested by his Sogdian officers, who included Spitamenes, Dataphernes, and Catanes. They then handed him over to the following Macedonian forces. The handing over of Bessus took place in a village, where he had been left by Spitamenes and Dataphernes. He was picked up by the Macedonian general Ptolemy who following Alexander's instructions, had Bessus brought to him naked in bonds. Bessus was at first flogged in public, and then his ears and nose were cut off, a traditional Persian punishment. He was finally sent to Ecbatana, where the Macedonians had him executed. The execution was supervised by Darius III's brother Oxyathres.

== In Persian literature ==
Bessus appears in the 11th-century Persian epic Shahnameh ("Book of Kings") under the name of Janusipar/Janushyar. Seeing as they are in a hopeless position, Janusipar along with Mahyar (Nabarzanes) murders Dara II (Darius III) and then attempt to negotiate with Iskandar (Alexander), eventually meeting up with him. Following the funeral of Dara, Iskandar has Janusipar and Mahyar executed.

== Bibliography ==
=== Ancient works ===
- Arrian, The Anabasis of Alexander.

=== Modern works ===
- Binder, Carsten (2021). "From Darius II to Darius III". In Jacobs, Bruno; Rollinger, Robert (eds.). A Companion to the Achaemenid Persian Empire. John Wiley & Sons. pp. 457–473. ISBN 978-1119174288.
- Briant, Pierre (2002). From Cyrus to Alexander: A History of the Persian Empire. Eisenbrauns. ISBN 978-1575060316.
- Briant, Pierre (2015), Darius in the Shadow of Alexander, Harvard University Press, ISBN 978-0674493094
- EIr. (1994). "Darius v. Darius III". In Yarshater, Ehsan (ed.). Encyclopædia Iranica. Vol. VII/2: Dastūr al-Afāżel–Dehqān I. London and New York: Routledge & Kegan Paul. pp. 51–54. ISBN 978-1-56859-020-2.
- Foltz, Richard (2019). A History of the Tajiks: Iranians of the East. New York: Bloomsbury Publishing. ISBN 978-1784539559.
- Frye, R. N. (1983). "The political history of Iran under the Sasanians". In Yarshater, Ehsan (ed.). The Cambridge History of Iran: The Seleucid, Parthian and Sasanian Periods. Vol. 3(1). Cambridge: Cambridge University Press. ISBN 0-521-20092-X.
- Heckel, Waldemar (2006). Who's Who in the Age of Alexander the Great: Prosopography of Alexander's Empire. Blackwell Publishing. ISBN 978-1405188395.
- Heckel, Waldemar (2020). In the Path of Conquest: Resistance to Alexander the Great. Oxford University Press. ISBN 978-0190076689.
- Kuhrt, Amélie; Sancisi-Weerdenburg, Helen (2006). "Bessus". In Salazar, Christine F.; Landfester, Manfred; Gentry, Francis G. (eds.). Brill's New Pauly. Brill Online.
- Nawotka, Krzysztof (2021). "The Conquest by Alexander". In Jacobs, Bruno; Rollinger, Robert (eds.). A Companion to the Achaemenid Persian Empire. John Wiley & Sons. pp. 473–485. ISBN 978-1119174288.
- Olbrycht, Marek Jan (2021). Early Arsakid Parthia (ca. 250-165 B.C.). Brill. ISBN 978-9004460751.
- Tavernier, Jan (2007). Iranica in the Achaeamenid Period (ca. 550-330 B.C.): Lexicon of Old Iranian Proper Names and Loanwords, Attested in Non-Iranian Texts. Peeters Publishers. ISBN 978-90-429-1833-7.
- Tuplin, Christopher J. (2020). "The Bodleian Letters: Commentary". In Tuplin, Christopher J.; Ma, John (eds.). Aršāma and his World: The Bodleian Letters in Context: Volume I: The Bodleian Letters. Oxford University Press. ISBN 978-0199687640.
- Schmitt, R. (1986). "Artaxerxes". In Yarshater, Ehsan (ed.). Encyclopædia Iranica. Vol. II/6: Art in Iran I–ʿArūż. London and New York: Routledge & Kegan Paul. pp. 654–655. ISBN 978-0-71009-106-2.
- Stark, Sören (2021). "The Iranian East". In Jacobs, Bruno; Rollinger, Robert (eds.). A Companion to the Achaemenid Persian Empire. John Wiley & Sons. pp. 695–711. ISBN 978-1119174288.
- Weiskopf, Michael (1989). "Bessos". In Yarshater, Ehsan (ed.). Encyclopædia Iranica. Vol. IV/2: Behruz–Bibliographies II. London and New York: Routledge & Kegan Paul. pp. 174–175. ISBN 978-0-71009-125-3.
- Wiesehöfer, Joseph (1986). "Ardašīr I i. History". In Yarshater, Ehsan (ed.). Encyclopædia Iranica. Vol. II/4: Architecture IV–Armenia and Iran IV. London and New York: Routledge & Kegan Paul. pp. 371–376. ISBN 978-0-71009-104-8.

Bessus Achaemenid dynasty Born: ? Died: 329 BC
Regnal titles
Preceded by Darius III	King of Kings of Persia; 330–329 BC	Succeeded by Alexander III (Alexander the Great)
