= Margaret Root =

Margaret Root may refer to:

- Margaret Cool Root, Professor of Near Eastern Art and Archaeology at the University of Michigan.
- Margaret E. Root, married name of Margaret E.B. Simpson (1906–1944), Scottish archaeologist.
