= Bactrian =

Bactrian may refer to:

- Bactria, an ancient region in Central Asia, including the modern Balkh region of Afghanistan
- Bactria (satrapy), under the Achaemenid Empire
- Bactrian language, an extinct Eastern Iranian language
- Bactrian camel, a species of camel in Asia
- Bactrian deer

== See also ==
- Bactria (disambiguation)
- Balkh (disambiguation)
- Bahlika (disambiguation)
