= Sisygambis =

Persian queen consort (died 323 BCE)

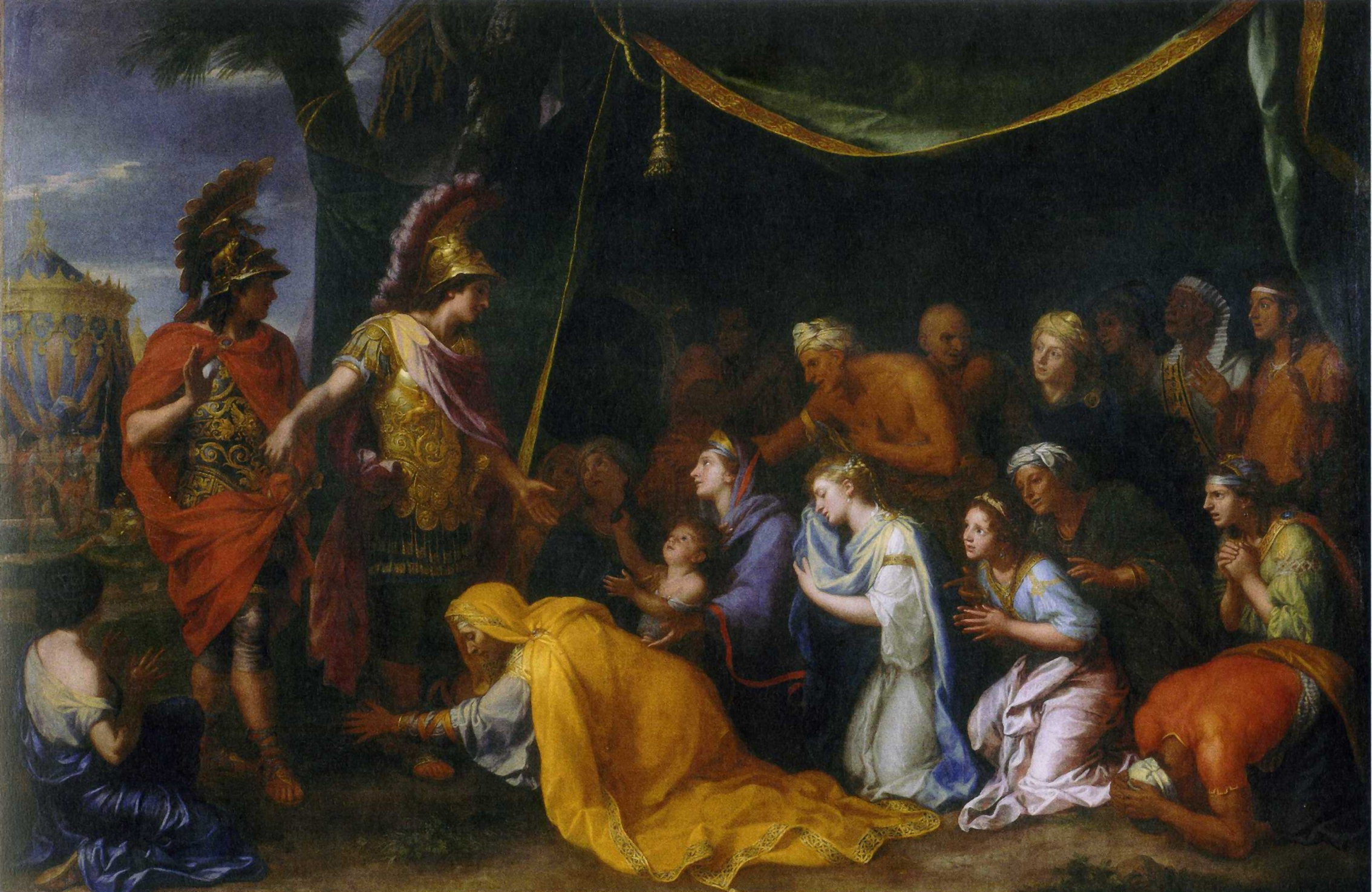
The family of Darius in front of Alexander, by Charles le Brun. Sisygambis (in yellow) kneels before the king

Sisygambis (Ancient Greek: Σισύγαμβις; died 323 BCE) was the mother of Darius III of Persia, whose reign was ended during the wars of Alexander the Great. After she was captured by Alexander at the Battle of Issus, she became devoted to him, and Alexander referred to her as "mother".

== Early life ==
She may have been the daughter of King Artaxerxes II Mnemon, or possibly of his brother Ostanes. If the latter, she married her own brother Arsames (an ancient Achaemenid tradition). Another possibility is that she was the daughter of an Uxian leader. She gave birth to Darius, Oxyathres, and possibly also Stateira I.

== Alexander's invasion ==
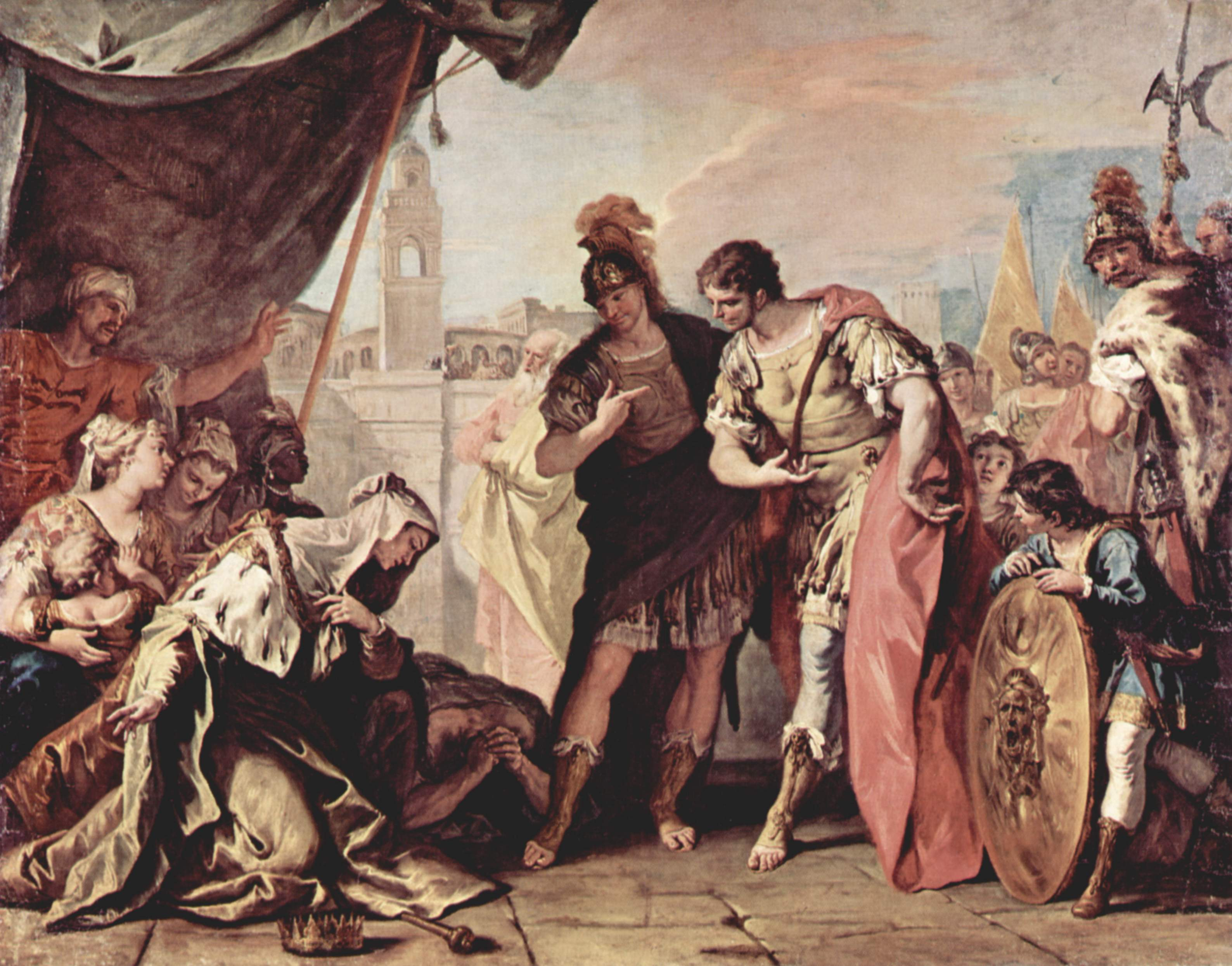
Alexander at the tent of Darius's family, by Sebastiano Ricci

At the Battle of Issus (333 BCE), Darius's army was routed by Alexander the Great, and the Persian king fled the field, leaving his extended family—including his mother; his wife, Stateira I; his children; and many others—to the mercy of Alexander. He captured them but treated them all with dignity, where many others would have executed them out of hand. When Alexander and Hephaestion went together to visit the captured Persian royal family, Sisygambis knelt to Hephaestion to plead for their lives, mistaking him for Alexander — Hephaestion was the taller, and both young men were similarly dressed. When she realized her mistake, she was acutely embarrassed, but Alexander reassured her with the words, "You were not mistaken, Mother; this man too is Alexander."

At the Battle of Gaugamela, Sisygambis and her family were kept within the baggage train behind Alexander's army. When the Persian army's Scythian cavalry broke through Alexander's forces to reach them, she allegedly refused to celebrate what appeared at first to be Persian victory. After Darius was killed shortly following his defeat at Gaugamela, Alexander sent his body to her, so that she could give him dignified funeral honors.

== Under Alexander ==
She was left at Susa with tutors to teach her and her family Greek, while Alexander pursued his conquests towards India. On his return in 324 BCE, he married Sisygambis's granddaughter, Stateira II, an event which was the centrepiece of the Susa weddings, where Stateira's sister, Drypetis, was also given in marriage to Hephaestion.

Within about a year of the wedding, however, both Hephaestion and Alexander had suddenly died eight months apart. On hearing of the latter's death, Sisygambis, overwhelmed with pain and despairing of the fate that loomed over her family, had herself sealed into her rooms and refused to eat. She is said to have died of grief and starvation four days later.

== Legacy ==
The scene of Sisygambis mistakenly kneeling before Hephaestion has been a popular subject in Western art, represented by Charles le Brun, Paolo Veronese, Justus Sustermans, and many others.

Asteroid 823 Sisigambis is named after her.
