= Ostanes (son of Darius II) =

Son of Achaemenid Persian emperor Darius II Nothos

In Greek sources, Ostanes is given as the name of one of the sons of the Achaemenid Persian emperor Darius (II) Nothos, and the grandfather of Darius (III) Codomannos. Aside from the name and relationship to the rulers, the sources do not have any information about the person.

The sources are Diodorus 17.5.5 and Plutarch Artax. 1.1.5. The latter explicitly names Ctesias (the physician of Artaxerxes (II) Mnemon) as his source. Ctesias, however, names Artostes as the son of Darius II, and Ferdinand Justi suggests that the sources confused Artostes as Ostanes.

His son Arsames (II) married his cousin Sisygambis and had issue:

- Darius III
- Oxathres.
