= Margaret Cool Root =

American professor

Academic background
- Education: Bryn Mawr College (BA, PhD)
- Thesis: The king and kingship in Achaemenid art (1976)

Academic work
- Discipline: Art historian; Archaeologist
- Sub-discipline: Achaemenid art
- Institutions: University of Michigan

Margaret Cool Root is Professor of Near Eastern Art and Archaeology at the University of Michigan. She is an expert on the Achaemenid Empire of ancient Persia and its interactions with Greece, and has published widely on Near Eastern material culture.

== Career ==
Margaret Cool Root was educated at Bryn Mawr College, where she gained both her BA and PhD. She joined the faculty at the University of Michigan's Department of the History of Art in 1978, where she is also a curator at the Kelsey Museum of Archaeology.

Her first major publication on the Achaemenid empire was the 1979 volume The King and Kingship in Achaemenid Art: Essays on the Creation of an Iconography of Empire (Acta Iranica 9); this was a revised and expanded version of her doctoral thesis.

In 1985, she was awarded a Fellowship of the John Simon Guggenheim Memorial Foundation. She has also received support for her work from the Samuel H. Kress Foundation, the National Endowment for the Humanities, and the Iran Heritage Foundation.

She was part of the editorial committee for the Ars Orientalis Volume 42.

== Selected publications ==
- 1979. The King and Kingship in Achaemenid Art: Essays on the Creation of an Iconography of Empire. Acta Iranica 9. Leiden: Brill.
- 1994 (ed., with Amelie Kuhrt and Heleen Sancisi-Weerdenburg).The Persian Empire: Continuity and Change (Achaemenid History 8). Leiden: Instituut voor het Nabije Oosten.
- 2001 (ed., with M. B. Garrison). Seals on the Persepolis Fortification Tablets. Volume I: Images of Heroic Encounter. Chicago: Oriental Institute Publications 117.
- 2002 (ed.). Medes and Persians. Reflections on Elusive Empires. Ars Orientalis 32.
- 2005. This Fertile Land: Signs and Symbols in the Early Arts of Iran and Iraq. Ann Arbor: Kelsey Museum of Archaeology.
