= Daxia (disambiguation) =

Daxia or Ta-hsia may refer to:

- Daxia, the name given in antiquity by the Chinese to the territory of Bactria plus another place of the same name in Shaanxi, said to be at the northern limit of the empire
- Daxia River, river in Gansu Province, China
- Xia dynasty, Chinese dynasty, ca. 2070–1600 BC
- Daxia University (formerly known as The Great China University), predecessor of East China Normal University
- Daxia, a fictional location in the storyline associated with the LEGO Bionicle toys

== See also ==
- Bactria (disambiguation)
