= Balkh (disambiguation) =

Balkh (Bactra in the ancient era) is a city in Afghanistan.

Balkh may also refer to:

- Balkh Province, a province of Afghanistan
- Balkh River, a river in Afghanistan
- Balkh, Tajikistan, a town in Tajikistan, formerly known as Kolkhozabad

== See also ==
- Bactria (disambiguation)
- Bactrian (disambiguation)
- Bahlika (disambiguation)
