= Bahlika =

Bahlika may refer to:

- Bactria, ancient region of Central Asia centred on the city of Balkh; Bahlika or Vahlika in Sanskrit
- Bahlikas, people mentioned in ancient Indian epics
- Bahlika (Mahabharata), the king of Bahlika kingdom in the ancient Indian epic Mahabharata

== See also ==
- Balkh (disambiguation)
- Bactria (disambiguation)
- Bactrian (disambiguation)
