= Stateira (wife of Alexander the Great) =

Daughter of Darius III, died 323 BC

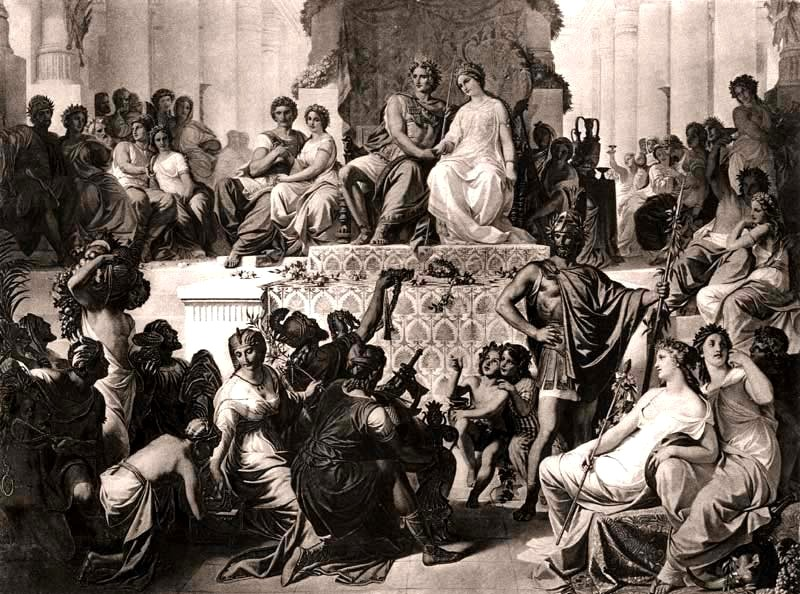
- The marriages of Stateira II to Alexander III of Macedon and her sister, Drypetis, to Hephaestion at Susa in 324 BC

Queen consort of Macedonia, Egypt and Persia
- Tenure: 324 – 10/11 June 323 BC
- Coronation: 324 BC, Suza
- Predecessor: Roxana of Bactria
- Co-consorts: Roxana of Bactria; Parysatis II
- Born: Presumably 340/339 BC
- Died: Summer 323 BC (after 11 June) (aged at least 14); Babylon
- Spouse: Alexander the Great

Stateira (Greek: Στάτειρα; born c. 340/339 BC, died 323 BC), possibly also known as Barsine, was the daughter of Stateira I and Darius III of Persia. After her father's defeat at the Battle of Issus, Stateira and her sisters became captives of Alexander of Macedon. They were treated well, and she became Alexander's second wife at the Susa weddings in 324 BC. At the same ceremony Alexander also married her cousin, Parysatis, daughter of Darius' predecessor. After Alexander's death in 323 BC, Stateira was killed by Alexander's other wife, Roxana.

== Name ==
Scholars have debated her name. In his list of marriages that occurred at Susa, Arrian (c. 86 – after 146), calls her "Barsine". She is commonly confused with another Barsine who was also held captive by Alexander around the same period. Historian William Woodthorpe Tarn asserts her official name was "Barsine", but she was likely commonly called "Stateira". Tarn cites other instances of confusion, noting that by the end of the 3rd century BC, legend often confused Roxane with Stateira as the daughter of Darius.

== Early life ==
Stateira was the eldest daughter of Darius III of Persia and his wife, also named Stateira. Both of her parents were frequently described as handsome or beautiful, leading Tarn to speculate Stateira "was sufficiently good-looking, at any rate for a princess, to be called ... beautiful." Her birthdate is unknown; by 333 BC she was of marriageable age. After Alexander the Great invaded Persia, Stateira and her family accompanied Darius' army. In November 333 Alexander's army defeated the Persians at the Battle of Issus. Darius fled, and the Macedonian army soon captured his family. Although they were his captives, under Alexander's orders Stateira, her mother, her sister Drypetis, her younger brother, and their paternal grandmother, Sisygambis, were treated well and allowed to retain their social status.

== Marriage to Alexander the Great ==
For the next two years, Stateira and her family followed Alexander's army. Her mother died in early 332, leaving Sisygambis to act as her guardian. Although Darius tried several times to ransom his family, Alexander refused to return the women. Darius then offered Alexander Stateira's hand in marriage and agreed to relinquish his claim to some of the land Alexander had already seized in exchange for ending the war. Alexander declined the offer, reminding Darius that he already had custody of both the land and Stateira, and that, if he chose to marry her, Darius' permission would not be necessary.

In 330 BC, Alexander left Stateira and her family in Susa with instructions that she should be taught Greek. Historian Elizabeth Donnelly Carney speculates that Alexander had already decided to marry Stateira and was preparing her for life as his wife. Stateira became Alexander's second wife in 324 BC, almost ten years after her capture, in a mass ceremony known as The Susa weddings which lasted five days. Ninety other Persian noblewomen were married to Macedonian soldiers who were loyal to Alexander; this included Drypetis, who married Alexander's friend, Hephaestion. At the same ceremony, Alexander married Parysatis, daughter of previous Persian ruler Artaxerxes III. It was fairly common practice for conquering rulers to marry the widow or daughter of the man they had deposed. By wedding both women, Alexander cemented his ties to both branches of the royal family of the Achaemenid Empire.

Alexander died the following year, 323 BC. After his death, his first wife Roxana colluded with Perdiccas to kill Stateira. Roxana wished to cement her own position and that of her son, Alexander IV, by ridding herself of a rival who could be or claim to be pregnant or to have given birth to a child. According to Plutarch's account, Stateira's sister, Drypetis, was killed at the same time; Carney believes that Plutarch was mistaken, and it was actually Parysatis who died with Stateira.

== Depictions ==
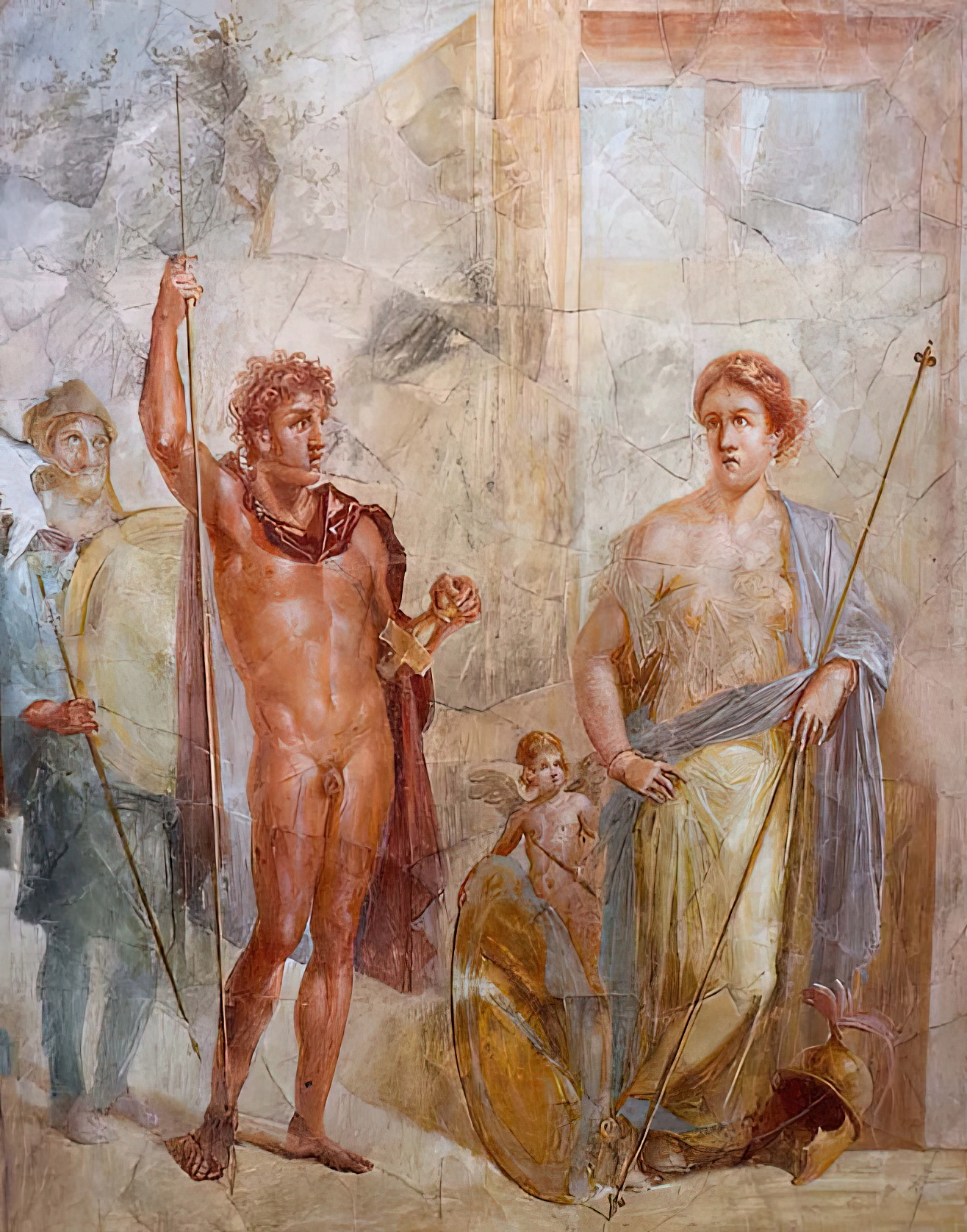
A mural in Pompeii, depicting Alexander and one of his wives

Stateira may be depicted in a fresco found during the excavations at Pompeii. The fresco depicts a nude warrior in a purple Macedonian cloak, likely Alexander. On his left stands a woman wearing a crown and holding a scepter. Scholars debate whether the woman is Roxana or Stateira.

- In the 2004 film Alexander by Oliver Stone, Stateira is portrayed by the French actress Annelise Hesme.
- Indian TV actress Riya Deepsi portrayed the character of Stateira II (called Barsine) in 2017 Indian TV series Porus.
- Nada El Balkasmi plays her in the Netflix docu-drama Alexander the Great: The Making of a God, where she is called Barsine.

== See also ==
- List of Iranian women royalty

== Sources ==
- Carney, Elizabeth Donnelly (2000), Women and Monarchy in Macedonia, Norman, OK: University of Oklahoma Press, ISBN 0-8061-3212-4
- O'Brien, John Maxwell (2001), Alexander the Great: The Invisible Enemy - A Biography, New York: Routledge, ISBN 0-415-10617-6
- Stewart, Andrew F. (1993), Faces of Power: Alexander's image and Hellenistic politics, Berkeley, CA: University of California Press, ISBN 0-520-06851-3
- Tarn, W.W. (2002), Alexander the Great: Volume II Sources and Studies, Cambridge University Press, ISBN 0-521-22585-X originally published 1948 by Cambridge University Press
