= Drypetis =

Achaemenid dynasty princess (died 323 BCE)

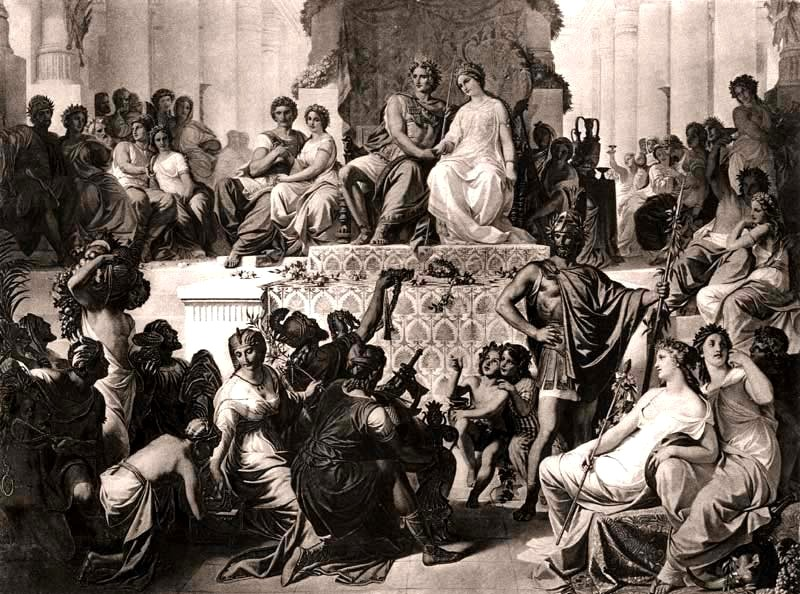
The marriages of Stateira II to Alexander III of Macedon and her sister, Drypetis, to Hephaestion at Susa in 324 BC, as depicted in a late-19th-century engraving

Drypetis (Ancient Greek: Δρυπῆτις or Δρυπετις; died 323 BCE) was the daughter of Stateira I and Darius III of Persia. Drypetis was born between 350 and 345 BCE, and, along with her sister Stateira II, was a princess of the Achaemenid dynasty.

== Capture and marriage ==
When Darius III began a military campaign against the invading army of Alexander the Great, he was accompanied by Drypetis, along with her sister, her mother, and her grandmother Sisygambis. Following the Battle of Issus in 333 BCE, Darius fled and his family was captured by Macedonian troops. Alexander personally met with the women and promised to provide dowries for Drypetis and Stateira.

Although Darius tried repeatedly to ransom his family, Alexander kept them with him until 331 BCE when Drypetis and her sister were sent to Susa to learn the Greek language.

In the spring of 324 BCE, Drypetis was married to Hephaestion, a general in Alexander's army, during the Susa weddings. Soon after, Drypetis was widowed when Hephaestion accompanied Alexander to Ecbatana and upon arriving in autumn, died after falling ill with a severe fever.

== Death ==
Many historians accept Plutarch's account that Drypetis was killed in 323 BCE alongside her sister Stateira. Alexander had died earlier that year, and his other widow Roxana – who was at the time pregnant with her second child – ordered to murder them, allegedly because of "jealousy", though modern historians presume she wished to remove potential rivals of her unborn child in case Stateira was pregnant too.

The reason why Drypetis was killed remains unclear; historian Elizabeth Donnelly Carney points that as Drypetis would not have borne a child by Alexander and as such, she would have been of little threat to Roxana's position, so Carney instead proposes that Roxana killed Parysatis II (daughter of Artaxerxes III of Persia), another wife of Alexander who could carry his potential heir. Alternatively, Daniel Ogden theorizes Drypetis might have been close supporter of her sister or she had been married to Alexander following Hephaestion's death, which would make it possible for her to be pregnant with the late King's legitimate child; both scenarios would give Roxana motive to assassinate her. On other hand Mary Renault speculates that the Queen's action might have been result of her hatred towards Hephaestion caused by his closeness with Alexander; Renault suspects Roxana murdered Drypetis in the act of posthumous vengeance against Hephaestion.

== Portrayals of Drypetis in fiction ==
- Drypetis is one of the main characters in Stephanie Thornton's 2015 novel The Conqueror's Wife (ISBN 978-0-451-47200-7).
- Indian actress Shalini Sharma plays the character of Drypetis in the 2017 Indian TV series Porus.
