= Bactria ovczinnikovii =

Scientific classification
- Kingdom: Plantae
- Clade: Tracheophytes
- Clade: Angiosperms
- Clade: Eudicots
- Order: Caryophyllales
- Family: Polygonaceae
- Genus: Bactria; Yurtseva & Mavrodiev (2016)
- Species: B. ovczinnikovii

Binomial name
- Bactria ovczinnikovii (Czukav.) Yurtseva & Mavrodiev (2016)

Synonyms
- Atraphaxis ovczinnikovii (Czukav.) Yurtseva (2013); Polygonum ovczinnikovii Czukav. (1962)

Species of flowering plant

Bactria ovczinnikovii is a species of flowering plant in the family Polygonaceae. It is the sole species in genus Bactria. It is a subshrub endemic to the Pamir Mountains of Tajikistan.
