= Stateira (wife of Darius III) =

Achaemenid dynasty heiress

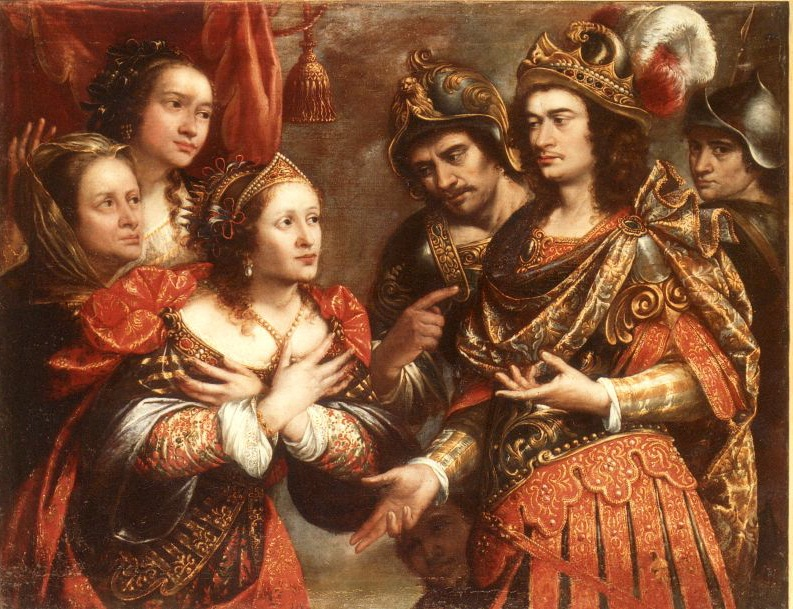
The family of Darios in front of Alexander, by Justus Sustermans and conserved in the Biblioteca Museu Víctor Balaguer, Vilanova i la Geltrú

Stateira (Greek: Στάτειρα; 370 BC – early 332 BC) was a queen of Persia as the wife and sister of Darius III of Persia of the Achaemenid dynasty.

She accompanied her husband while he went to war. It was because of this that she was captured by Alexander the Great after the Battle of Issus, in 333 BC, at the town of Issus. Her husband abandoned his entire family at the site as he fled from Alexander, including his mother Sisygambis and his daughters Stateira II and Drypetis. Alexander is reported to have treated them with great respect.

According to Plutarch, Stateira died giving birth to a son, Ochus, in early 332 BC. She was given a splendid burial by Alexander, befitting her status as the wife of the Great King of Persia. However, this does not fit with other narratives as Ochus was already of an age to have survived childhood illness (between 4 and 7 years old) by 333 BC. We cannot say with certainty what happened to Stateira or her son. Darius' mother Sisygambis had a lifelong respect and genuine friendship with Alexander.

In 324 BC, her daughter, Stateira, married Alexander, and her other daughter, Drypetis, married one of his lifetime companions, Hephaestion. When Alexander died one year later these royal Persian women mourned his death, further indicating personal relationships rather than merely diplomatic ones. According to Plutarch, both of her daughters were assassinated by another wife of Alexander, Roxana and Perdiccas, one of Alexander's generals. Upon hearing the news of Alexander's death, Sisygambis said farewell to her family, turned to the wall, and fasted herself to death.

== Historical novels and film ==
- Stateira is a minor character in The Conqueror's Wife by Stephanie Thornton, 2015, Softcover ISBN 978-0-451-47200-7
- Stateira is a secondary character in the Netflix docu-drama series Alexander: The Making of a God by Hugh Ballantyne, 2024. It is depicted within the series that the son, whom she died giving birth to, had been fathered not by Darius but by Alexander the Great during Stateira's stay at captivity. Additionally, Stateira is given the episode of confusing Alexander with Hephaestion, which is reported in historical sources for her mother, Sisygambis.
