= Oxyathres of Persia =

Persian prince, brother of Darius III

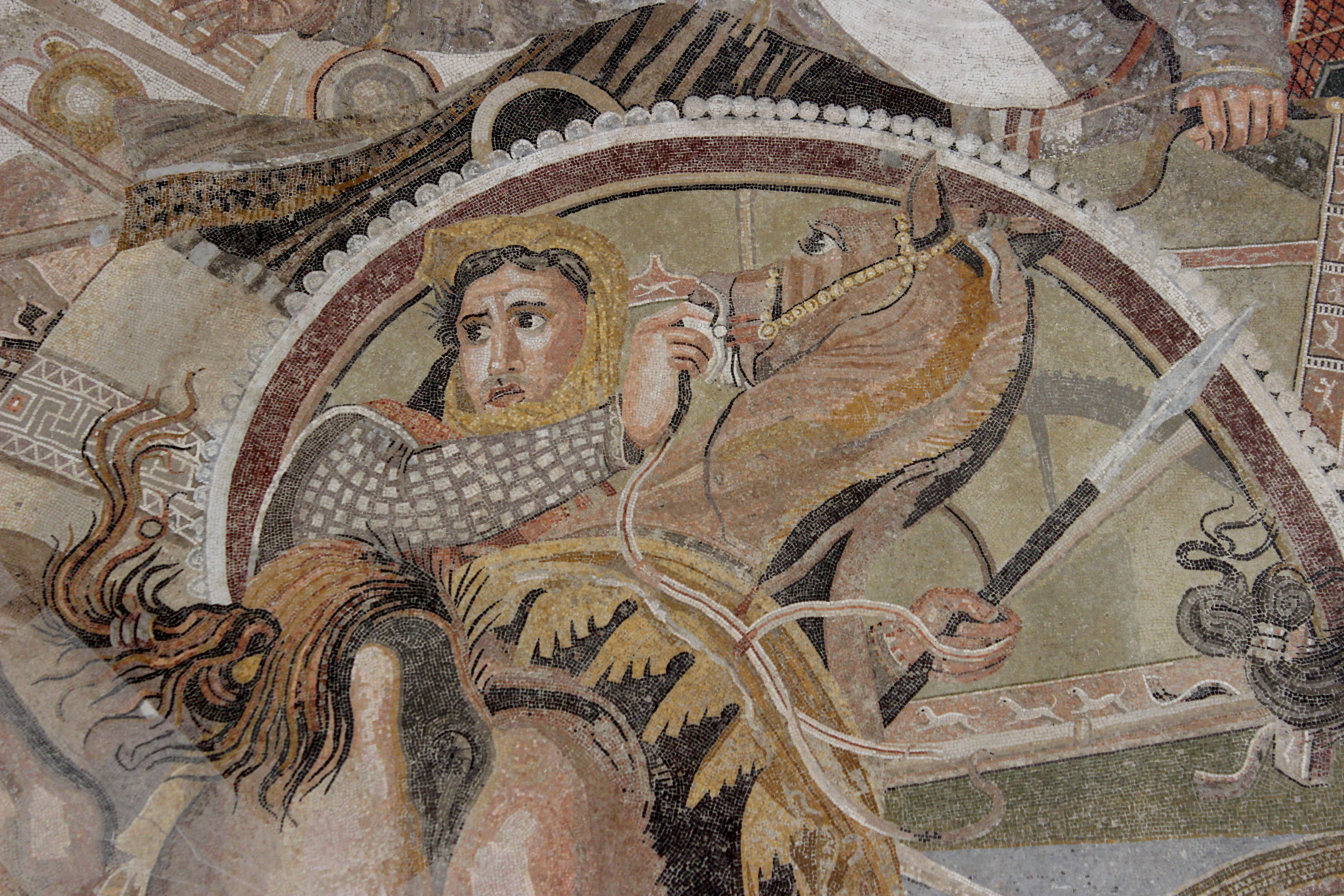
Oxyathres on Alexander Mosaic

Oxyathres (Ancient Greek: Οξυάθρης; in Old Persian Vaxšuvarda; lived 4th century BC) was a brother of the Persian king Darius III Codomannus. He was the son of a certain Arsames, and grandson of Ostanes. He was distinguished for his bravery and talent, and in the Battle of Issus, 333 BC, took a prominent part in the combat in defence of the king, when attacked by the Macedonian cavalry under Alexander himself, as shown in the celebrated Alexander Mosaic found in Pompeii. He afterwards accompanied Darius on his flight into Bactria, and fell into the hands of Alexander during the pursuit, but was treated with the utmost distinction by the conqueror, who even assigned him an honourable post about his own person; and subsequently devolved upon him the task of punishing Bessus for the murder of Darius. He was also the father of Amastris queen of Heraclea.

A description of Oxyathres at the Battle of Issus:

His brother, Oxyathres, saw Alexander bearing down on Darius and moved the cavalry under his command right in front of the king's chariot. Oxyathres far surpassed his comrades in the splendour of his arms and in physical strength, and very few could match his courage and devotion to Darius. In that engagement especially he won distinction by cutting down some Macedonians who were recklessly thrusting ahead and putting others to flight.

— Quintius Curtius Rufus, 3.11.8
