= Bactria (fly) =

Scientific classification
- Kingdom: Animalia
- Phylum: Arthropoda
- Class: Insecta
- Order: Diptera
- Family: Asilidae
- Genus: Bactria

Genus of flies

Bactria is a genus of robber flies in the family Asilidae. There are at least three described species in Bactria.

== Species ==
These three species belong to the genus Bactria:

- Bactria hypoleucochaeta (Bezzi, 1908)^{c g}
- Bactria rhopalocera (Karsch, 1888)^{c g}
- Bactria vagator (Wiedemann, 1828)^{c g}

Data sources: i = ITIS, c = Catalogue of Life, g = GBIF, b = Bugguide.net
