= Darius III =

King of the Achaemenid Empire from 336 to 330 BC

Darius III 𐎭𐎠𐎼𐎹𐎺𐎢𐏁
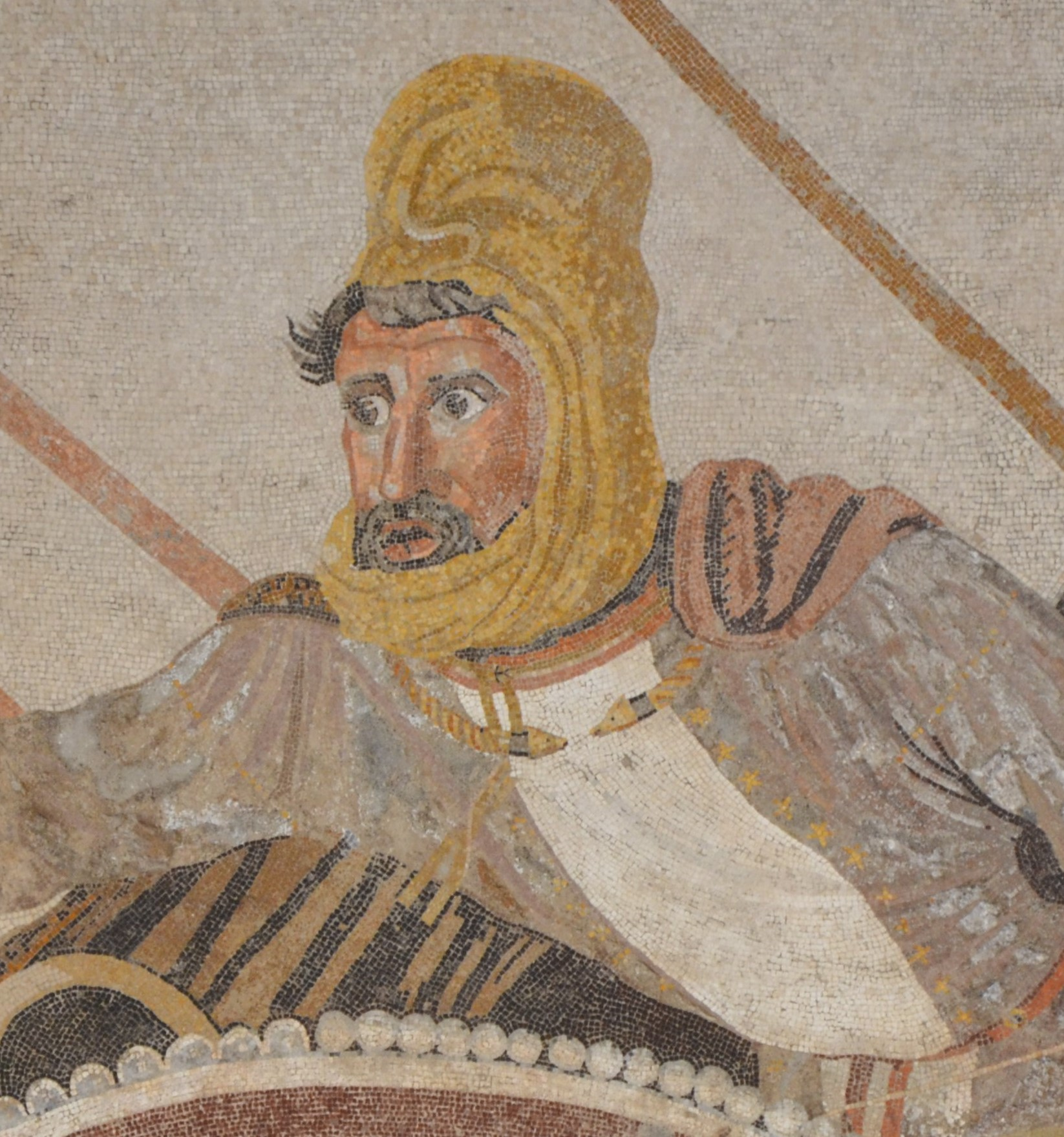
- Depiction of Darius III during the Battle of Issus in the Alexander Mosaic (c. 100 BC)

King of Kings of the Achaemenid Empire
- Reign: 336–330 BC
- Predecessor: Artaxerxes IV Arses
- Successor: Alexander the Great (Macedonian Empire); Artaxerxes V (self-proclaimed)

Pharaoh of Egypt
- Reign: 336–332 BC
- Predecessor: Artaxerxes IV
- Successor: Alexander the Great
- Born: c. 380 BC
- Died: July 330 BC (aged approximately 50); Parthia
- Burial: Persepolis
- Spouse: Stateira I
- Issue: Stateira II; Drypetis; Ochus
- Dynasty: Achaemenid
- Father: Arsames
- Mother: Sisygambis
Religion
Ancient Iranian religion
Darius III
- Military career
- Conflicts: Conflicts: Wars of Alexander the Great; Persian campaign of Alexander the Great; Battle of Issus; Battle of Gaugamela

Darius III (Old Persian: 𐎭𐎠𐎼𐎹𐎺𐎢𐏁 Dārayavaʰuš; Ancient Greek: Δαρεῖος Dareios; c. 380 – 330 BC) was the thirteenth and last Achaemenid King of Kings of Persia, reigning from 336 BC to his death in 330 BC.

Contrary to his predecessor Artaxerxes IV Arses, Darius was a distant member of the Achaemenid dynasty. During his early career, he was reportedly an obscure figure among his peers and first rose to prominence during the Cadusian expedition of Artaxerxes III in the 350s BC. As a reward for his bravery, he was made the satrap of Armenia. Around 340 BC, he was placed in charge of the royal "postal service," a high-ranking position. In 338 BC, Artaxerxes III met an abrupt end after being poisoned by the court eunuch and chiliarch (hazahrapatish) Bagoas, who installed Artaxerxes' youngest son Arses on the throne. He only reigned for a few years, until Bagoas had him poisoned as well. Darius was subsequently installed on the throne and soon forced Bagoas to drink his poison after discovering that the eunuch had planned to poison him as well.

In 334 BC, Alexander the Great began his invasion of the Persian Empire and subsequently defeated the Persians in several battles before looting and destroying their capital, Persepolis, by fire in 330 BC. With the Persian Empire now effectively under Alexander's control, Alexander then decided to pursue Darius. Before Alexander reached him, however, Darius was killed by his relative Bessus, who was also the satrap of Bactria.

== Name ==
Before his accession, Darius bore the name of Artashata (Old Persian: *Artašiyāta, "Happy in Arta"). The 2nd-century Roman historian Justin is the only historian to refer Darius as Codomannus, a name he supposedly bore before he rose to prominence. It may have been his nickname, or possibly a third name. Its etymology is uncertain. Badian has suggested that the name was of Western Semitic origin, most likely from the Aramaic qdmwn ("from the East, Easterner"). Having two names was not unusual; there are several recorded instances of Babylonian figures having two names, often a Babylonian and Aramaic name. One Persian magnate is also attested with a Babylonian and Iranian name. However, this practice seems to have fallen out of favour during Darius's lifetime. Badian suggests that his birth name was the Aramaic Codomannus, which he later dropped in favour of Artashata when he rose in ranks. He first adopted the regnal name of Darius (Old Persian: Daraya-vahauš, "he who holds firm the good(ness)") when he ascended the Achaemenid throne in 336 BC.

== Historiography ==
The last century of the Achaemenid era is notable for lacking in sources, especially during the reign of Darius III. He is not attested in any Persian sources and is almost completely only known from the reports of Greek historians, who portray his career as a contradiction to that of the successful Alexander the Great.

== Background ==
Darius was born in c. 380 BC. He was a distant member of the royal Achaemenid dynasty. He was the son of a certain Arsames, and grandson of Ostanes, whose father Darius II ruled the Achaemenid Empire from 424 BC to 405 BC. His mother was Sisygambis, a woman of obscure origins. She was probably of Achaemenid descent, although it is unknown to which branch she belonged. She may have been the daughter of Ostanes, and thus the sister of Arsames. Darius had a brother and sister: Oxyathres and Stateira I, respectively.

== Early life ==
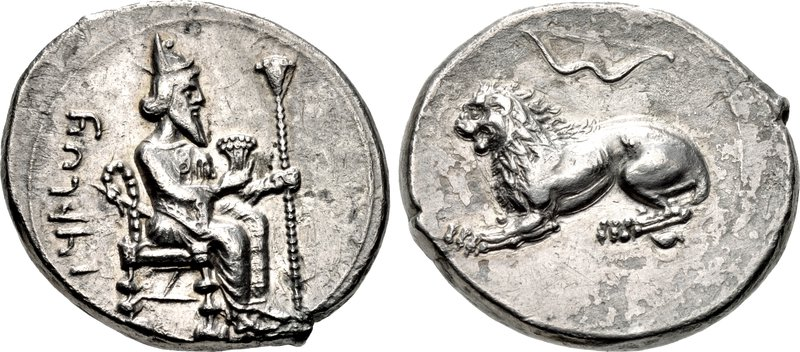
Coin minted in Cilicia by its satrap Mazaeus, portraying Artaxerxes III as pharaoh on the obverse, while a lion is depicted on the reverse

Darius is first attested during the Cadusian expedition of Artaxerxes III (r. 358–338 BC) in the 350s BC. During a battle, Darius distinguished himself by slaying a warrior in single combat. His exploit was noticed by Artaxerxes III, who sent him gifts and gave him the Satrapy of Armenia. It was probably after this promotion that Darius married for the first time, to an unknown noblewoman, who bore him two daughters, and possibly a son named Ariobarzanes. His first marriage has suggested being the terminus ad quem for when he dropped his Aramaic name, Codomannus. Greek writers report that Darius later became the "courier" and "slave" of the king, which some modern historians believe was written to belittle Darius. However, the terms are in reality a Greek translation of the Old Persian bandaka, which did not mean slave, but "henchman, (loyal) servant, vassal."

In the Behistun inscription, Darius the Great (r. 522–486 BC) uses the term to refer to his high-ranking officers. It has been deduced that Darius was probably in charge of the royal "postal service," a high-ranking position. He may have held the same Persepolis sector headed by the prominent Persian officer Pharnaces (d. 497 BC). It is uncertain when this happened, it has been suggested this promotion took place around 340 BC, when Darius married for a second time, with his sister Stateira I. In 339 BC, they had a son named Ochus. This demonstrates that Artaxerxes III, who was highly alert on any possible relative to challenge the throne, did not consider Darius to pose the slightest threat to him or his son Arses. Artaxerxes III's sudden death in September 338 BC, therefore, proved to be a problematic issue for Persia. Several modern historians argue that it paved the way for the fall of the Achaemenid Empire. Bagoas, acting as kingmaker, put the young Arses (Artaxerxes IV) on the throne. Arses was determined on trying to free himself from Bagoas' authority and influence; he made an unsuccessful effort to have the latter poisoned, only to be poisoned himself along with the rest of his family by Bagoas, who put Darius on the throne in 336 BC. Darius's reputation for bravery, his probable royal descent, and the support he enjoyed from Artaxerxes III all helped him gain acceptance amongst the aristocracy. Macedonian propaganda, made to legitimize the conquests of Alexander the Great a few years later, accused Darius of playing a key role in the murder of Arses, who was portrayed as the last king of the Achaemenid royal house.

According to legend, Bagoas soon attempted to poison Darius III as well, but his plans were discovered. Darius III summoned Bagoas and asked him to drink a toast for him, giving him his cup which was filled with poison. Bagoas refused, claiming to be sick, but was forced to drink Darius's 'medicine', resulting in his death. This happened around the time of Alexander's accession to the Macedonian throne in the autumn of 336 BC. At the start of Darius III's reign, Egypt and Babylon may have briefly been plunged into rebellion. Regardless, they were seemingly not of heavy significance, as reports about the events quickly disappear.

== Conflict with the Greeks ==
=== Philip's campaign ===
In 336 BC Philip II of Macedon was authorized by the League of Corinth as its hegemon to initiate a sacred war of vengeance against the Persians for desecrating and burning the Athenian temples during the Second Persian War, over a century before. He sent an advance force into Asia Minor under the command of his generals Parmenion and Attalus to liberate the Greeks living under Persian control. After they took the Greek cities of Asia from Troy to the Maiandros river, Philip was assassinated and his campaign was suspended while his heir consolidated his control of Macedonia and the rest of Greece.

=== Alexander's campaign ===
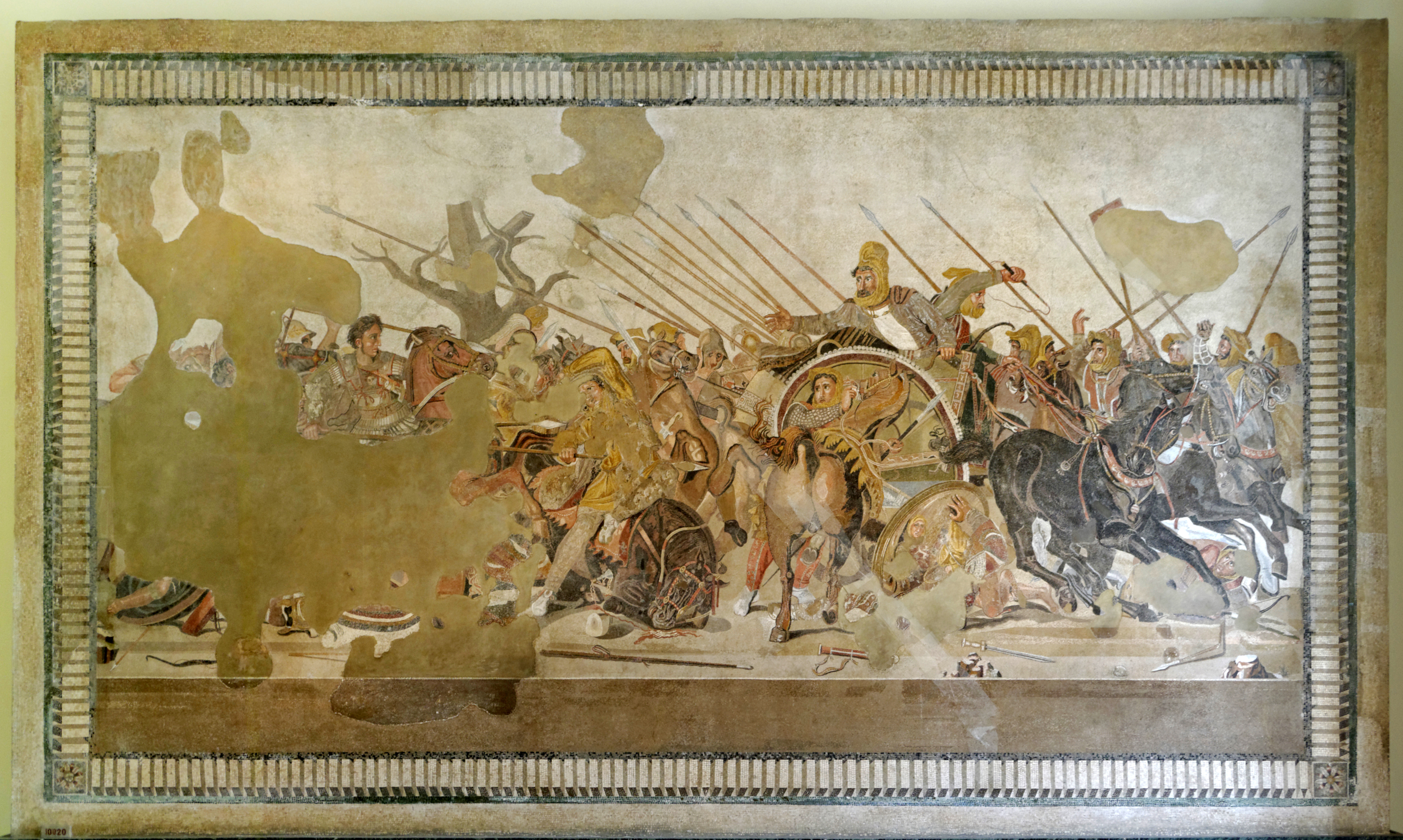
Darius III portrayed (in the middle) in battle against Alexander in a Greek depiction; Possible illustration of either Battle of Issus or Battle of Gaugamela

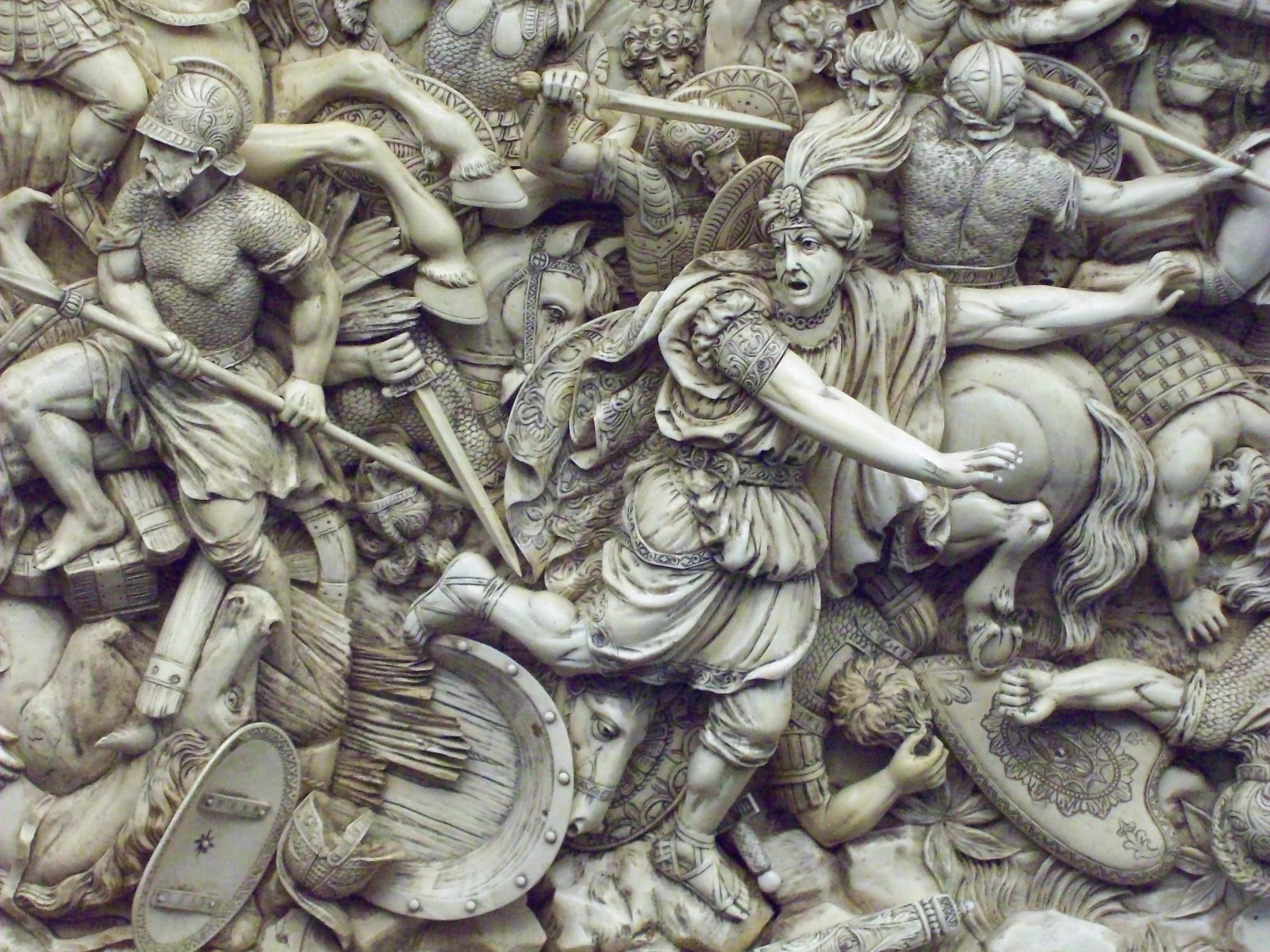
Darius's flight at the Battle of Gaugamela (18th-century ivory relief)

In the spring of 334 BC, Philip's heir, Alexander, who had himself been confirmed as Hegemon by the League of Corinth, invaded Asia Minor at the head of an army of Macedonian and other Greek soldiers. This invasion, which marked the beginning of the Wars of Alexander the Great, was followed almost immediately by the victory of Alexander over the Persians at Battle of the Granicus. Darius never showed up for the battle, because there was no reason for him to suppose that Alexander intended to conquer the whole of Asia, and Darius may well have supposed that the satraps of the 'lower' satrapies could deal with the crisis, so he instead decided to remain at home in Persepolis and let his satraps handle it. In the previous invasion of Asia Minor by the Spartan king Agesilaus II, the Persians had pinned him in Asia Minor while fomenting rebellion in Greece. Darius attempted to employ the same strategy, with the Spartans rebelling against the Macedonians, but the Spartans were defeated at Megalopolis.

Darius III was successfully able to corner Alexander and pin him at the gates of Issus, Despite catching the Macedonians by surprise and holding a significant numerical advantage, Darius's army was outflanked after the collapse of the Persian left flank. Eventually, Darius was forced to exit the field. Rather than a simple act of cowardice as portrayed by pro-Macedonian Greek sources like Arrian, modern historians note that Darius's withdrawal from the field was a calculated tactical necessity to prevent his capture or death, which would have ended the empire's resistance immediately. However, his sudden departure caused the remaining Persian lines to break and allowed Alexander to capture the royal baggage train—including Darius's family—virtually intact. Darius subsequently attempted to negotiate the release of his family through diplomatic correspondence, though Alexander refused unless Darius acknowledged him as the supreme ruler of Asia.

Circumstances were more in Darius's favor at the Battle of Gaugamela in 331 BC. He had a good number of troops who had been organized on the battlefield properly, he had the support of the armies of several of his satraps, and the ground on the battlefield was almost perfectly even, so as not to impede movement of his scythed chariots. Despite all these beneficial factors, he still fled the battle before any victor had been decided and deserted his experienced commanders as well as one of the largest armies ever assembled. Another source accounts that when Darius perceived the fierce attack of Alexander, as at Issus he turned his chariot around, and was the first to flee, once again abandoning all of his soldiers and his property to be taken by Alexander. Many Persian soldiers died that day, so many in fact that after the battle the casualties of his forces ensured that Darius would never again raise an imperial army. Darius then fled to Ecbatana and attempted to raise a third army, while Alexander took possession of Babylon, Susa, and the Persian capital at Persepolis. Darius reportedly offered all of his empire west of the Euphrates river to Alexander in exchange for peace several times, each time denied by Alexander against the advice of his senior commanders. Alexander could have declared victory after the capture of Persepolis, but he instead decided to pursue Darius.

The Battle of Gaugamela, in which Alexander the Great defeated Darius III of Persia in 331 BC, took place approximately 100 kilometres (62 mi) west of Erbil, Iraq. After the battle, Darius managed to flee to the city. However, somewhat inaccurately, the confrontation is sometimes known as the "Battle of Arbela."

== Flight, imprisonment, and death ==
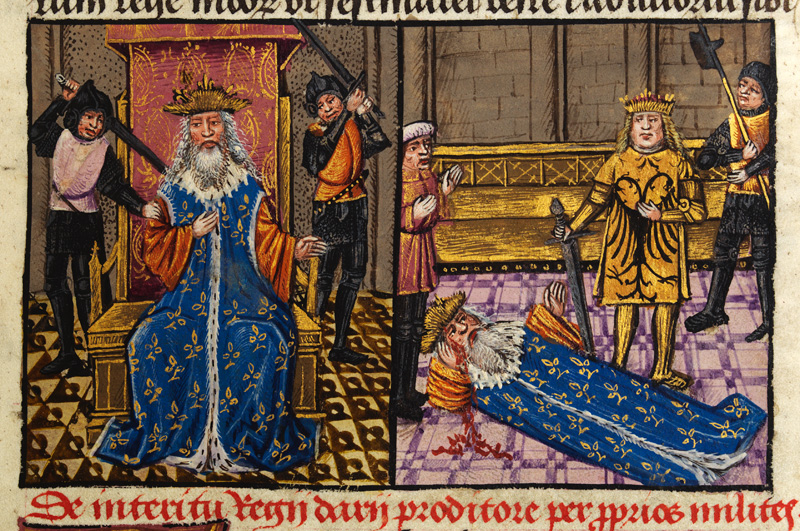
Murder of Darius and Alexander at the side of the dying king depicted in a 15th-century manuscript

Darius attempted to restore his once-great army after his defeat at the hands of Alexander, but he failed to raise a force comparable to that which had fought at Gaugamela, partly because the defeat had undermined his authority, and also because Alexander's liberal policy, for instance in Babylonia and Persis, offered an acceptable alternative to Persian policies.

When at Ecbatana, Darius learned of Alexander's approaching army, he decided to retreat to Bactria where he could better use his cavalry and mercenary forces on the more even ground of the plains of Asia. He led his army through the Caspian Gates, the main road through the mountains that would work to slow the following army. Persian forces became increasingly demoralized with the constant threat of a surprise attack from Alexander, leading to many desertions and eventually a coup led by Bessus, a satrap, and Nabarzanes, who managed all audiences with the King and was in charge of the palace guard. The two men suggested to Darius that the army regroup under Bessus and that power would be transferred back to the King once Alexander was defeated. Darius did not accept this plan and his conspirators became more anxious to remove him for his successive failures against Alexander and his forces. Patron, a Greek mercenary, encouraged Darius to accept a bodyguard of Greek mercenaries rather than his usual Persian guard to protect him from Bessus and Nabarzanes, but the King could not accept for political reasons and grew accustomed to his fate. Bessus and Nabarzanes eventually bound Darius and threw him in an ox-cart while they ordered the Persian forces to continue. According to Curtius' History of Alexander, at this point Alexander and a small, mobile force arrived and threw the Persians into a panic, leading Bessus and two other conspirators, Satibarzanes and Barsaentes, to wound the king with their javelins and leave him to die.

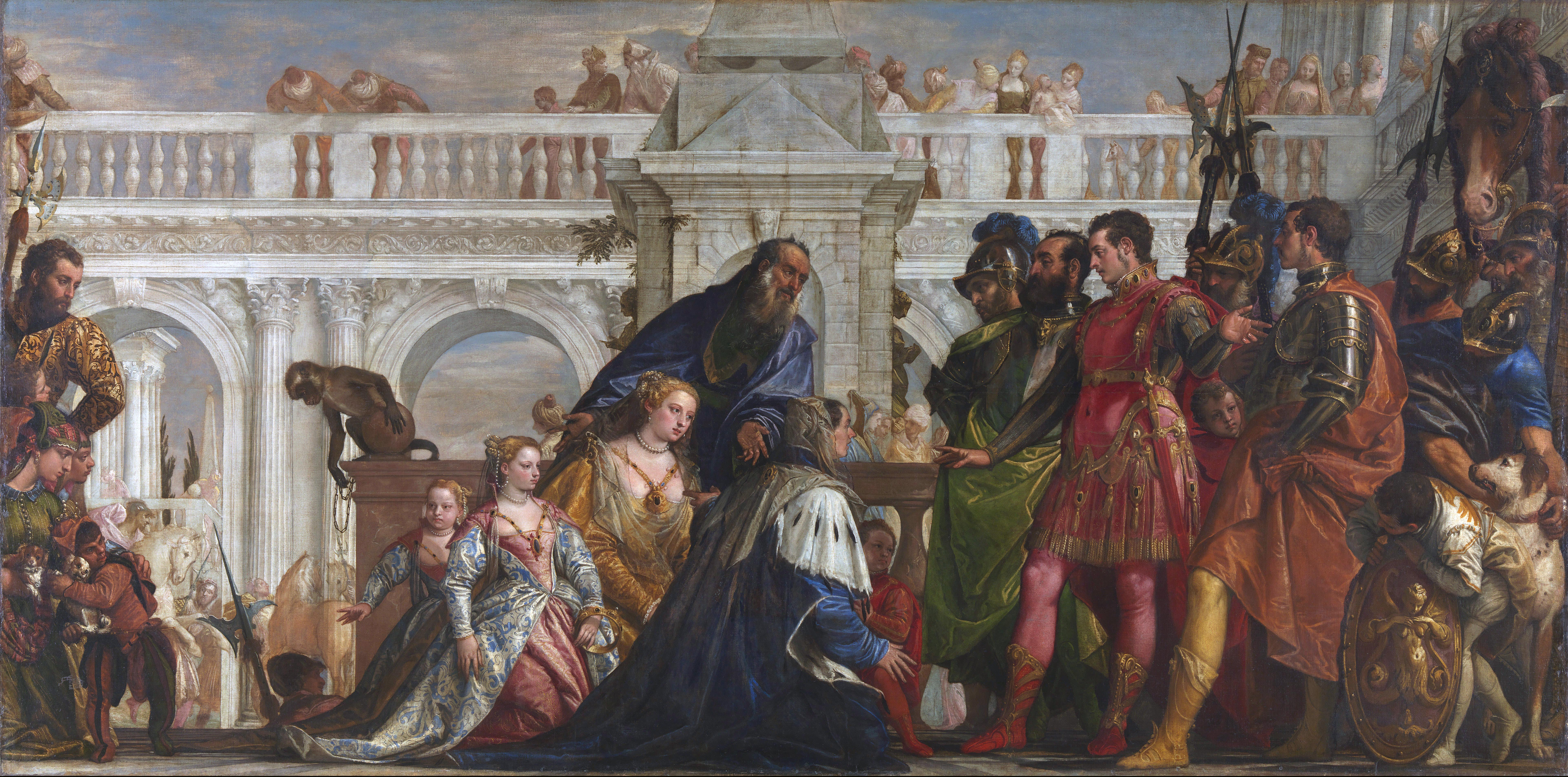
The Family of Darius before Alexander, by Paolo Veronese, 1570

According to ancient sources such as Plutarch and Quintus Curtius Rufus, Alexander treated the body of Darius III with royal honors and sent it to Persepolis for a traditional burial. A Macedonian soldier found Darius either dead or dying in the wagon shortly thereafter—a disappointment to Alexander, who wanted to capture Darius alive. Alexander saw Darius' dead body in the wagon and took the signet ring off the dead king's finger. Afterwards, he sent Darius's body back to Persepolis, gave him a magnificent funeral and ordered that he be buried, like all his royal predecessors, in the royal tombs. Darius's tomb has not yet been discovered. Alexander eventually married Darius's daughter Stateira at Susa in 324 BC.

However, modern historians frequently interpret this not as a gesture of personal magnanimity, but as a calculated political effort to legitimize Alexander's claim to the Persian throne and justify his pursuit of Darius's killers as unlawful usurpers. By funding a grand Achaemenid royal funeral, Alexander cast himself as the dutiful, mourning successor to the crown rather than a foreign conqueror. This "avenger" narrative allowed him to portray Bessus and the treacherous satraps not as opposing military forces, but as illegitimate regicides who broke sacred oaths. Under Persian imperial tradition, punishing these "usurpers" gave Alexander a lawful mandate to pacify and absorb the eastern satrapies without stoking continuous local rebellion. Furthermore, honoring the late king allowed Alexander to win over the influential Persian noble class and bureaucracy, whose administrative cooperation was vital for managing the rapidly expanding Macedonian Empire.

With the old king defeated and given a proper burial, Alexander's rulership of Persia became official. This led to Darius being regarded by some historians as cowardly and inefficient, as under his rulership, the entirety of the Persian Empire fell to a foreign invader. After killing Darius, Bessus took the regal name Artaxerxes V and began calling himself the King of Asia. He was subsequently captured by Alexander, tortured, and executed. Another of Darius's generals ingratiated himself to Alexander by giving the conqueror Darius's favored companion, Bagoas.

== Bibliography ==
=== Ancient works ===
- Diodorus Siculus, Bibliotheca historica.

=== Modern works ===
- Badian, Ernst (2000). "Darius III". Harvard Studies in Classical Philology. 100: 241–267. doi:10.2307/3185218. JSTOR 3185218. (registration required)
- Badian, Ernst (2015). "Sisigambis". Encyclopædia Iranica, online edition. New York.
- Briant, Pierre (1985). "Alexander the Great". Encyclopædia Iranica, online edition, Vol. I, Fasc. 8. New York. pp. 827–830.
- Briant, Pierre (2002). From Cyrus to Alexander: A History of the Persian Empire. Eisenbrauns. pp. 1–1196. ISBN 9781575061207.
- Briant, Pierre (2015), Darius in the Shadow of Alexander, Harvard University Press, ISBN 9780674745209
- Dandamaev, Muhammad A. (1989). A Political History of the Achaemenid Empire. Brill. ISBN 978-9004091726.
- Eilers, W.; Herrenschmidt, C. (1988). "Banda". Encyclopædia Iranica, online edition, Vol. III, Fasc. 7. New York. pp. 682–685.
- EIr. (1994). "Darius v. Darius III". Encyclopædia Iranica, online edition, Vol. VI, Fasc. 1. New York. pp. 51–54.
- Frye, R. N. (1988). "Bābak (1)". Encyclopaedia Iranica, Vol. III, Fasc. 3. pp. 298–299.
- Hanaway, William L. (1994). "Dārāb-nāma". Encyclopædia Iranica, online edition, Vol. VII, Fasc. 1. New York. pp. 8–9.
- Heckel, Waldemar (2020). In the Path of Conquest: Resistance to Alexander the Great. Oxford University Press. ISBN 978-0190076689.
- LeCoq, P. (1986). "Arses". Encyclopaedia Iranica, Vol. II, Fasc. 5. p. 548.
- Llewellyn-Jones, Lloyd (2017). "The Achaemenid Empire". In Daryaee, Touraj (ed.). King of the Seven Climes: A History of the Ancient Iranian World (3000 BCE – 651 CE). UCI Jordan Center for Persian Studies. ISBN 9780692864401.
- Olbrycht, Marek Jan (2016). "Dynastic Connections in the Arsacid Empire and the Origins of the House of Sāsān". In Curtis, Vesta Sarkhosh; Pendleton, Elizabeth J.; Alram, Michael; Daryaee, Touraj (eds.). The Parthian and Early Sasanian Empires: Adaptation and Expansion. Oxbow Books. ISBN 9781785702082.
- Roberts, John. "Darius III". Oxford Reference. Oxford University Press.
- Schmitt, R. (1986). "Artaxerxes III". Encyclopaedia Iranica, Vol. II, Fasc. 6. pp. 658–659.
- Schmitt, Rudiger (1994). "Darius i. The Name". Encyclopædia Iranica, online edition, Vol. VII, Fasc. 1. New York. p. 40.
- Tafazzoli, Ahmad (1994). "Dārā(b) (1)". Encyclopædia Iranica, online edition, Vol. VII, Fasc. 1. New York. pp. 1–2.
- Waters, Matt (2014). Ancient Persia: A Concise History of the Achaemenid Empire, 550–330 BCE. Cambridge University Press. pp. 1–272. ISBN 9781107652729.

Darius III Achaemenid dynasty Born: c. 380 BC Died: 330 BC
Preceded by Arses	King of Kings of Persia; 336–330 BC	Succeeded by Bessus
Preceded by Arses	Pharaoh of Egypt; XXXI Dynasty; 336–332 BC	Succeeded by Alexander the Great
