= Heleen Sancisi-Weerdenburg =

Dutch archaeologist and historian

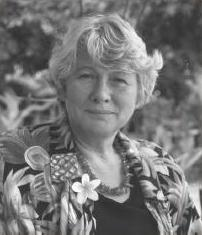
- Born: Helena Wilhelmina Agatha Maria Sancisi-Weerdenburg; May 23, 1944; Haarlem, Netherlands
- Died: May 28, 2000 (aged 56); Utrecht, Netherlands
- Citizenship: Dutch
- Years active: Achaemenid Empire, Classical Greece

Academic background
- Education: Leiden University

Academic work
- Discipline: Ancient history
- Institutions: University of Groningen; Utrecht University

Heleen W.A.M. Sancisi-Weerdenburg (23 May 1944, in Haarlem – 28 May 2000, in Utrecht), was a Dutch ancient historian, specializing in classical Greek and Achaemenid history.

Sancisi-Weerdenburg began her studies in ancient history at the University of Leiden, graduating in 1967 to research under the supervision of Professor W. den Boer, a specialist in Greek history. For her doctoral thesis she set herself the task, which turned into a perennial theme, of trying to disentangle the complex realities of the Achaemenid Empire from the distorting web created by Greek literary conventions. To do this, she studied Old Persian, primarily on her own, and Iranian archaeology with Louis Vanden Berghe in Ghent. She received her doctor of letters in history and archaeology from Leiden University in 1980. Having taught first at the University of Groningen 1975–89, she achieved the Professorship in Ancient History at Utrecht in 1990. She was a pioneering scholar of ancient Greek history and Persian history. Her work stressed the importance of returning to the classical authors (including the Greek "father of history," Herodotus, and the Athenian playwright Aeschylus) with fresh critical awareness of the importance of reading them against the backdrop of subtexts and agendas embedded in their complex perceptions of the ancient Persian histories and their 200-year-long empire founded by Cyrus the Great.

In the historiography of the classical tradition and its modern elaborations, the ancient Achaemenid Persian peoples who fought with the Greeks in the so-called Persian Wars became the quintessential Other. Layers of assumptions of Western cultural primacy made it possible to take at face value the words of the Greeks, even when important cues within those sources, combined with primary evidence from the Persian vantage point, cried out for critical reappraisal. Sancisi-Weerdenburg systematically tackled an array of astutely targeted issues in Western traditions on the Achaemenid Persian empire—including the notion of decadence as a defining feature of ancient Persian kingship and the notion of the role of harem intrigue as the defining social maneuverability of women in the empire. The themes that became touchstones of the new historical agenda on the Persian empire spearheaded by Sancisi-Weerdenburg invariably resonated with concerns that invited engagement and energetic debate by a stimulating range of scholars.

Heleen W.A.M. Sancisi-Weerdenburg died of cancer at the age of 56 in Utrecht, the Netherlands.

== Bibliography ==
Heleen Sancisi-Weerdenburg was a prolific writer on Achaemenid history with numerous publications in both Dutch and English. Some of the most important are:

- Sancisi-Weerdenburg, H. (1980). "Congress and Communications: Colloquium on Early Achaemenid History, Groningen, 29th May 1981". Persica. 9: 231–232.
- Sancisi-Weerdenburg, H., ed. (1987). Sources, Structures and Syntheses. Proceedings of the Groningen 1983 Achaemenid History Workshop. Achaemenid History. Vol. 1. Leiden: NINO. ISBN 978-90-6258-401-7.
- Sancisi-Weerdenburg, H., ed. (1987). The Greek Sources. Proceedings of the Groningen 1984 Achaemenid History Workshop. Achaemenid History. Vol. 2. Leiden: NINO. ISBN 978-90-6258-402-4.
- Kuhrt, A.; Sancisi-Weerdenburg, H., eds. (1988). Method and Theory. Proceedings of the London 1985 Achaemenid History Workshop. Achaemenid History. Vol. 3. Leiden: NINO. ISBN 978-90-6258-403-1.
- Sancisi-Weerdenburg, H. (1988). "Was there ever a Median empire?". In Kuhrt, A.; Sancisi-Weerdenburg, H. (eds.). Method and Theory. Proceedings of the London 1985 Achaemenid History Workshop. Achaemenid History. Vol. 3. Leiden: NINO. pp. 197–212. ISBN 978-90-6258-403-1.
- Kuhrt, A.; Sancisi-Weerdenburg, H., eds. (1987). Centre and Periphery. Proceedings of the Groningen 1986 Achaemenid History Workshop. Achaemenid History. Vol. 4. Leiden: NINO. ISBN 978-90-6258-404-8.
- Drijvers, J.W.; Sancisi-Weerdenburg, H., eds. (1987). The Roots of the European Tradition. Proceedings of the Groningen 1987 Achaemenid History Workshop. Achaemenid History. Vol. 5. Leiden: NINO. ISBN 978-90-6258-405-5.
- Kuhrt, A.; Sancisi-Weerdenburg, H., eds. (1991). Asia Minor and Egypt: Old Cultures in a New Empire. Achaemenid History. Vol. 6. Leiden: NINO. ISBN 978-90-6258-406-2.
- Drijvers, J.W.; Sancisi-Weerdenburg, H., eds. (1991). Through Travellers' Eyes. European Travellers on the Iranian Monuments. Achaemenid History. Vol. 7. Leiden: NINO. ISBN 978-90-6258-407-9.
- Sancisi-Weerdenburg, H.; Kuhrt, A.; Root, M.C., eds. (1994). Continuity and Change. Proceedings of the Last Achaemenid History Workshop 1990. Achaemenid History. Vol. 8. Leiden: NINO. ISBN 978-90-6258-408-6.
- Kuhrt, A. (1996). Sancisi-Weerdenburg, H. (ed.). Persepolis Seal Studies: An Introduction With Provisional Concordances of Seal Numbers and Associated Documents on Fortification Tablets 1-2087. Achaemenid History. Vol. 9. Leiden: NINO. ISBN 978-90-6258-409-3.
- Drijvers, J.-W.; de Hond, J.; Sancisi-Weerdenburg, H., eds. (1997). “Ik Hadde de Nieuwsgierigheid”. De reizen door het Nabije Oosten van Cornelis de Bruijn (ca. 1652-1727). MVEOL (in Dutch). Vol. 31. Leiden: Ex Oriente Lux.
