= Amélie Kuhrt =

British historian (1944–2023)

Amélie Kuhrt FBA
- Born: 23 September 1944
- Died: 2 January 2023 (aged 78)

Academic background
- Education: Somerville College, Oxford; King's College, London

Academic work
- Discipline: History
- Sub-discipline: Ancient Near East
- Institutions: King's College London; University College London; SOAS

Amélie Kuhrt (23 September 1944 – 2 January 2023) was a British historian and specialist in the history of the ancient Near East.

Kuhrt was educated at King's College London, University College London and SOAS.

Professor Emerita at University College London, she specialised in the social, cultural and political history of the region from c. 3000–100 BC, especially the Assyrian, Babylonian, Persian and Seleucid empires.

Kuhrt died on 2 January 2023, at the age of 78.

== Achaemenid History Workshops ==
Kuhrt was co-organiser of the Groningen-based Achaemenid History Workshops with Heleen Sancisi-Weerdenberg from 1983 to 1990. These workshops were noted for their "multidisciplinary approach... [which] saved Achaemenid history from being viewed from a Hellenocentric stance" and inspired other thematically focused scholarly activities in the 1980s and 1990s.^{:522–23} Proceedings from Achaemenid History Workshops were published in eight volumes (Achaemenid History: I-VIII, 1987–94).

== Awards and honours ==
In 1997, Kuhrt's book The Ancient Near East : c.3000-330 BC was awarded the annual American History Association's James Henry Breasted Prize for the best book in English on any field of history prior to the year 1000 AD: the committee noted "enormous breadth and depth of Amelie Kuhrt’s work, her ability to elucidate even the most confused periods and deftly to incorporate both source problems and scholarly disagreements in her text, and her lucid prose make this volume a pleasure to read... she has expanded the parameters of the field of world history."

Kuhrt was elected a Fellow of the British Academy in 2001. She was a member of the British Academy's Projects Committee, which is responsible for assessing the scope for new projects and initiatives sponsored by the Academy. Kuhrt was elected to Honorary Membership of the American Oriental Society in 2009.

== Publications ==
=== Selected books ===
- The Persian Empire: A Corpus of Sources of the Achaemenid Period. London: Routledge, 2007. ISBN 0-415-43628-1
- The Ancient Near East : c.3000-330 BC. London : Routledge, 1995. ISBN 0-415-01353-4 (v.1), ISBN 0-415-12872-2 (v.2)
- Images of Women in Antiquity. With Averil Cameron. London : Routledge, 1993. ISBN 0-415-09095-4

=== Selected articles ===
- "Ancient Near Eastern History: The Case of Cyrus the Great of Persia", in Hugh G. M. Williamson (ed), Understanding the History of Ancient Israel. Oxford University Press. 2007. ISBN 0-19-726401-8, pp. 107–127
- "Cyrus the Great of Persia: Images and Realities", in M. Heinz & M. H. Feldman (eds), Representations of Political Power: Case Histories from Times of Change and Dissolving Order in the Ancient Near East, pp. 174–175. Eisenbrauns, 2007. ISBN 1-57506-135-X
- "The Problem of Achaemenid Religious Policy", in B. Groneberg & H. Spieckermann (eds.), Die Welt der Gotterbilder, Walter de Gruyter, 2007, pp. 117–142
- "Sennacherib's Siege of Jerusalem", in A.K. Bowman et al. (eds) Representations of Empire: Rome and the Mediterranean World. Oxford University Press. 2004. ISBN 0-19-726276-7 pp. 13 – 33.
- "The Achaemenid Persian empire (c. 550-c. 330 BCE): continuities, adaptations, transformations", in S.E. Alcock et al. (eds.), Empires: perspectives from archaeology and history. Cambridge University Press. 2001, pp. 93–123
- "Women and War", Journal of Gender Studies in Antiquity 2 (1) (2001) 1 - 25
- "The Persian Kings and their subjects: A unique relationship?", Orientalistische Literaturzeitung, vol. 96 no. 2 (2001), pp. 165–172
- "Israelite and Near Eastern historiography," in A. Lemaire & M. Saebo (eds), Vetus Testamentum Supplementum 80 (2000), pp. 257–279
- "Usurpation, conquest and ceremonial: From Babylon to Persia", in D. Cannadine, S. Price (eds), Rituals of Royalty: Power and Ceremonial in Traditional Societies, Cambridge University Press, 1992, pp. 20–55
- "Babylonia from Cyrus to Xerxes", in John Boardman (ed), The Cambridge Ancient History: Vol IV - Persia, Greece and the Western Mediterranean. Cambridge University Press, 1982. ISBN 0-521-22804-2 p. 124
- "The Cyrus Cylinder and Achaemenid imperial policy", Journal of Studies of the Old Testament 25 (1983), pp. 83–97
