= Achaemenid Bactria =

Territory of the Achaemenid Empire

Bactria Bāxtriš
- Satrapy of the Achaemenid Empire
- 545–540 BC–330 BC
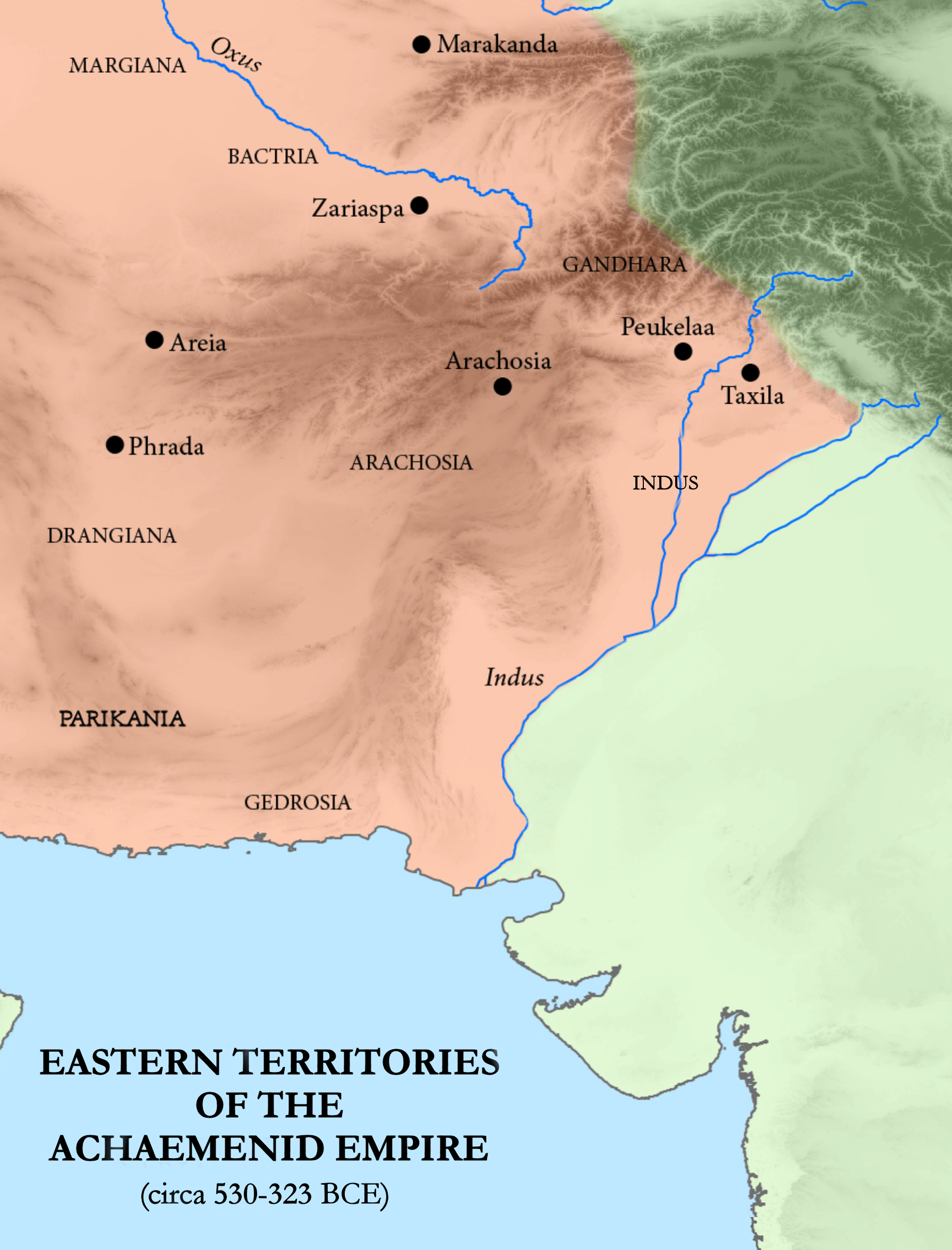
- Eastern territories of the Achaemenid Empire, including Bactria
- Capital: Zariaspa
- Historical era: Antiquity
  - Conquest by Cyrus the Great: 545–540 BC
  - Conquest by Alexander the Great: 330 BC
Succeeded by
Macedonian Empire

Bactria (Old Persian: 𐎲𐎠𐎧𐎫𐎼𐎡𐏁, romanized: Bāxtriš) was a satrapy of the Achaemenid Empire. It was conquered between 545–540 BC by Cyrus the Great.

== History ==
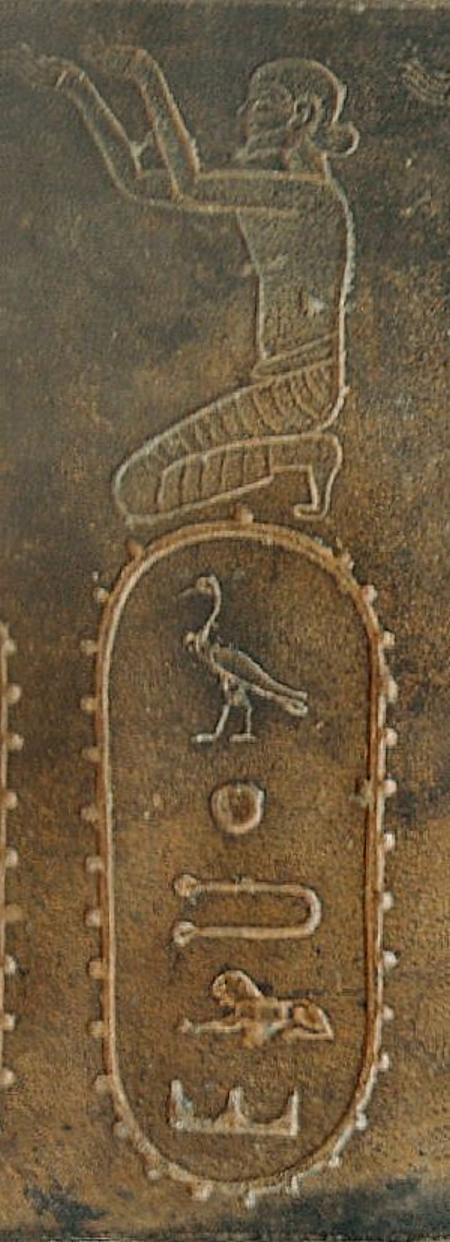
Representation of Bactria on the Egyptian Statue of Darius I.

Bactria is attested in 520 BC in the Behistun inscription. It was a special satrapy in that it was ruled by a crown prince or an intended heir. The capital of Bactria was Zariaspa, and the region also sometimes included Sogdia. During the reign of Darius the Great, the Bactrians and the Aeglians were placed in one tax district, which was supposed to pay 360 talents every year. Greeks communities and language became common in the area since the reign of Darius I, when the inhabitants of the Greek city of Barca, in Cyrenaica, were deported to Bactria for refusing to surrender assassins. Other exiled Greeks, most of them prisoners of war, were deported to Bactria up until the arrival of Alexander the Great in 328 BC. These settlers later established the hellenistic Kingdom of Bactria.

== Administration ==
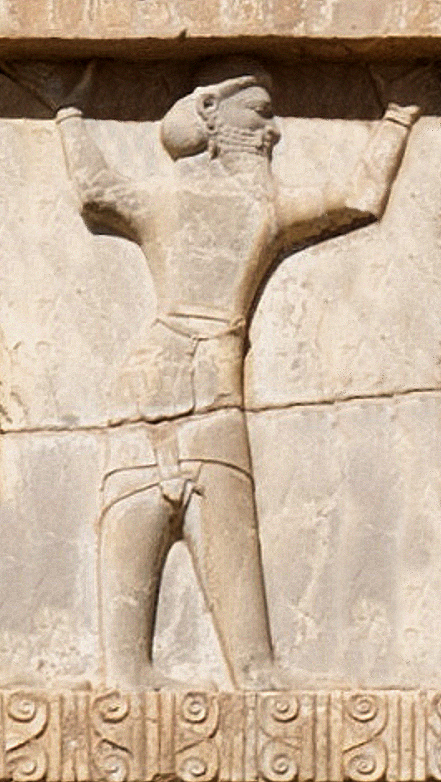
Xerxes I tomb, Bactrian soldier circa 470 BC

Within the eastern territories of the Achaemenid Empire, Bactria was a satrapy of unique importance. Its satrap frequently exercised administrative power over neighboring territories. Zariaspa (present-day Balkh) functioned as the primary residence for the satrap. During the reign of Artaxerxes II (r. 405/4–359/8 BC), a cult statue of the Zoroastrian goddess Anahita was constructed there. Other significant urban centers within this satrapy included Varnu, Khulm, and Drapsa.

Close connections existed between Bactria and the central Achaemenid territories. The Persepolis Administrative Archives frequently records travelers moving between these locations. Zariaspa also served as the eastern end of a major route that began at Ephesus.

Local residents comprised at least a portion of the governing administration in Bactria. Their names were Iranian and often incorporated regional references, such as the river deity Oxus found in the name of the scribe Haš(y)a‐vaxšu. In the eastern provinces, Aramaic was seemingly used as a professional, usually written language for official administrative work. These officials seemingly learned Aramaic during scribal training, following standard Achaemenid royal protocols for letter structure and formal addresses.

Languages had specific administrative roles throughout the empire. In the core regions, multilingual scribes used Elamite to manage financial records and lower level tasks. Discovery of Elamite accounting records at Kandahar matches the material from Persepolis, indicating this system was used in present-day Afghanistan as well. Therefore, the surviving Aramaic documents offer only limited views into the economic activities in Achaemenid Bactria.

== See also ==
- Bactria

== Sources ==
- Gzella, Holger (2021). "Bactria". In Jacobs, Bruno; Rollinger, Robert (eds.). A Companion to the Achaemenid Persian Empire. John Wiley & Sons. pp. 951–964. ISBN 978-1119174288.
- Olbrycht, Marek Jan (2021). Early Arsakid Parthia (ca. 250-165 B.C.). Brill Publishers. ISBN 978-9004460751.
- Stark, Sören (2021). "The Iranian East". In Jacobs, Bruno; Rollinger, Robert (eds.). A Companion to the Achaemenid Persian Empire. John Wiley & Sons. pp. 695–710. ISBN 978-1119174288.
