= List of sieges conducted by Demetrius I Poliorcetes =

List of sieges by a historical figure

This page presents a non-exhaustive list of cities conquered or besieged by Demetrius I Poliorcetes during his military campaigns from 311 to 285 BC.

== List of sieges ==
Victory - 25
Defeat - 2
Another result - 3

Date	City	Allies (including Demetrius)	Opponents	Outcome	References
311	Es-Sela Location: Arabia	Demetrius I Poliorcetes	Nabateans	Retreat of Demetrius after being repelled; Treaty of friendship with the Nabataeans	
311-309 ?	Babylon Location: Mesopotamia	Demetrius I Poliorcetes	Seleucus I Nicator	Capture of Babylon	
307	Megara Location: Greece	Demetrius I Poliorcetes	Garrison of Cassander	Capture of Megara	
307	Athens Location: Greece	Demetrius I Poliorcetes	Demetrius of Phalerum; Garrison of Cassander	Capture of Mounychia and Athens	
306	Karpasia Location: Cyprus	Demetrius I Poliorcetes; Antigonus I Monophthalmus	Menelaus; Ptolemy I Soter	Capture of Karpasia	
306	Urania Location: Cyprus	Demetrius I Poliorcetes; Antigonus I Monophthalmus	Menelaus; Ptolemy I Soter	Capture of Urania	
306	Salamis Location: Cyprus	Demetrius I Poliorcetes; Antigonus I Monophthalmus	Menelaus; Ptolemy I Soter	Capture of Salamis and the whole island	
305-304	Rhodes Location: Aegean Sea	Demetrius I Poliorcetes; Antigonus I Monophthalmus	Ares; Ptolemy I Soter; Lysimachus; Cassander	Retreat of Demetrius after his defeat; Building of the Colossus of Rhodes	
304	Chalcis Location: Euboea	Demetrius I Poliorcetes	Chalcis; Thebes; Cassander	Capture of Chalcis	
304	Oropos Location: Greece	Demetrius I Poliorcetes	Oropos; Thebes; Cassander	Capture of Oropos	
304	Phyle Location: Greece	Demetrius I Poliorcetes	Garrison of Cassander	Capture of Phyle	
304	Panactum Location: Greece	Demetrius I Poliorcetes	Garrison of Cassander	Capture of Panactum	
304	Kechries Location: Greece	Demetrius I Poliorcetes	Kechries	Capture of Kechries	
304	Epidaurus Location: Greece	Demetrius I Poliorcetes	Epidaurus	Capture of Epidaurus	
303	Sicyon Location: Greece	Demetrius I Poliorcetes	Garrison of Ptolemy	Capture of Sycion	
303	Corinth Location: Greece	Demetrius I Poliorcetes	Corinth	Capture of Corinth	
303	Bura Location: Greece	Demetrius I Poliorcetes	Bura	Capture of Bura	
303	Scirus (Arcadia) Location: Greece	Demetrius I Poliorcetes	Scirus (Arcadia)	Capture of Skyros	
303	Argos Location: Greece	Demetrius I Poliorcetes	Argos	Capture of Argos	
303	Orchomenus Location: Greece	Demetrius I Poliorcetes	Orchomenus	Capture of Orchomenus	
300-299	Lampsacus Location: Ionia	Demetrius I Poliorcetes	Garrison of Lysimachus	Captures the city two times but doesn't occupy it	
Between 298 and 295	Messene Location: Greece	Demetrius I Poliorcetes	Nicodemus of Messene; Messene	Capture of Messene probable but not certain	
294	Rhamnous Location: Greece	Demetrius I Poliorcetes	Rhamnous	Capture of Rhamnous	
294	Eleusis Location: Greece	Demetrius I Poliorcetes	Eleusis	Capture of Eleusis	
294	Athens Location: Greece	Demetrius I Poliorcetes	Lachares; Athens	Capture of Athens	
294	Sparta Location: Greece	Demetrius I Poliorcetes	Sparta	Not certain that he besieged or entered the city, despite two victorious battles in the surroundings.	
293	Thebes Location: Greece	Demetrius I Poliorcetes	Thebes; Cleonymus of Sparta; Sparta	Capture of Thebes	
292-291	Thebes Location: Greece	Demetrius I Poliorcetes; Antigonus II Gonatas	Thebes	Capture of Thebes	
287	Athens Location: Greece	Demetrius I Poliorcetes	Athens	Retreat of Demetrius after his defeat	
287	Sardis Location: Ionia	Demetrius I Poliorcetes	Sardis; Lysimachus	Capture of Sardis	
