= Third siege of Babylon =

Military action in 309 BC

Siege of Babylon
- Part of the Babylonian War
Date	January–March 309 BC
Location	Babylon
Result	Antigonid tactical victory, citadel remains under Seleucid control, Seleucid retreat
Territorial changes	Antigonus captures parts of the city

Belligerents
Antigonids	Seleucids

Commanders and leaders
Antigonos; Archelaos	Seleukos

Strength
75,000	20,000

Casualties and losses
Unknown	Unknown

The third siege of Babylon took place during Antigonus I Monophthalmus' expedition to the Seleucid domain in the context of the Babylonian War.

== Background ==
In 310 BC, after an unsuccessful siege of the city of Bayblon by his son Demetrius, Antigonus decided to march against Seleucus himself. He mobilized an army of more than 75,000 men and marched towards Babylon. Seleucus, who had just reconquered Babylon, was heavily outnumbered, but emboldened by his earlier victories he decided to make a stand.

== Siege ==
The confrontation began with several clashes on the outskirts of the city between 12 January and 10 February. On 19 January Antigonus attacked the city and his troops took parts of the city. The Antigonids plundered some of Babylon's temples. They did not capture all of the city, and after some attempts on the citadel, Antigonus retreated. Seleucus, realising how desperate the situation was, ordered a retreat; the Seleucids were attacked by the Antigonids while retreating, the fighting lasted until 28 February, when the remaining Seleucids retreated to the citadel or to the fields outside the city. On the 2 March Antigonus managed to capture and raze Cutah, but the Seleucid army nevertheless managed to escape.

== Aftermath ==
Antigonus named Archelaus as the new satrap, while Seleucus ordered his army to disperse and fight the invader in a guerrilla war. Antigonus retaliate by plundering and razing the countryside, trying to force Seleucus to fight a pitched battle. In 308 B.C. Seleucus faced Antigonus in a battle somewhere in southern Mesopotamia or northern Babylonia. When the two armies met, they fought an inconclusive engagement. Both retired to their camps for the night; but whereas Antigonus's army disarmed and went to sleep, Seleucus ordered his men to dine and rest in full armor and in their ranks. He then launched a surprise attack towards the morning and overwhelmed Antigonus's forces. Antigonus managed to escape and gave up on the idea of reconquering the upper satrapies, leaving the east to Seleucus.

== Sources ==
- Jeff Champions, Antigonus the One-Eyed: Greatest of the Successors
- Richard A. Billows, Antigonos the One-Eyed and the Creation of the Hellenistic State
