= Epirote-Macedonian War of 289 BC =

289 BCE war

Epirote-Macedonian War (289 BC)
- Part of the Ancient era and the Fifth Sacred War
Date	289 BC
Location	Epirus and Macedonia (present-day Greece)
Result	Peace treaty: The Epirotes gain land in Macedon, while the Macedonians keep Corcyra and Lanassa.

Belligerents
Epirus; Aetolian League	Macedonia

Commanders and leaders
Pyrrhus (WIA)	Demetrius I Poliorcetes; Pantauchus (WIA)

Strength
20,000–25,000 men	Greater

Casualties and losses
Unknown	Unknown amount killed 5,000 captured

The Epirote-Macedonian War of 289 BC was an armed conflict which occurred during the year of 289 BC between the Kingdom of Epirus and the Kingdom of Macedonia.

== Background ==
In 292 BC, while Demetrius was besieging Thebes, Pyrrhus invaded Thessaly however Demetrius immediately gathered an army and began to march to Pyrrhus. Outnumbered, Pyrrhus withdrew.

== Conflict ==
In 289 BC Pyrrhus was betrayed by his second wife Lanassa, who left him and fled to Corcyra with her dowry, giving herself and the city to Demetrius I who sailed to the city, taking it. After returning from Corcyra, Demetrius planned to invade Epirus. Before invading Epirus, Demetrius planned to defeat the Aetolian League, a close ally to Pyrrhus, however the Aetolians, not seeking battle, retreated to the nearby hills. Seeing this, Demetrius left his best general Pantauchus together with 11,000 to engage with the Aetolians while Demetrius himself began marching to Epirus. Pyrrhus gathered the Epirote army consisting of 20,000–25,000 men and marched to Aetolia.

=== Battle of Aetolia ===
While Demetrius had now reached Epirus and began raiding the region, Pantauchus and Pyrrhus passed through each other while being on separate roads. Pantauchus, according to some sources challenged Pyrrhus to a duel which he accepted. During the duel, while hurling spears at each other, Pyrrhus was lightly injured while Pantauchus was seriously injured. After this duel, the "motivated" Epirote army charged and defeated the Macedonian army killing many and capturing 5,000 as prisoners of war. Upon hearing about the defeat, Demetrius withdrew from Epirus, while Pyrrhus set free his prisoners.

=== Pyrrhus's Macedonian Campaign ===
In 289 BC, after receiving news that Demetrius was ill, Pyrrhus launched a campaign in Macedonia. Initially he planned to raid and pillage Macedonian settlements, however due to facing no resistance as Demetrius was not able to raise an army, the Epirote forces penetrated all the way to the old Macedonian capital of Aegae. When Demetrius was well enough to raise an army, Pyrrhus, outnumbered, retreated back to Epirus.

== Aftermath ==
Planning to invade Asia, Demetrius made peace with Pyrrhus, giving the Epirotes land in Macedonia while keeping Corcyra and Lanassa for himself and ensuring Pyrrhus's neutrality during his Asian campaign.

== Sources ==
- Champion, Jeff (2009). Pyrrhus of Epirus. Barnsley, South Yorkshire: Pen & Sword Books Limited. ISBN 978-1-84468-282-9.
