= Campaign of the Chersonese =

Military campaign of Demetrius Poliorcetes

- Part of the Wars of the Diadochi
- Spanish map of the Thracian Chersonese and the Hellespont
Date	300–299 BC
Location	Thracian Chersonese, Hellespont
Result	Antigonid victory

Belligerents
Demetrios I	Lysimachos

Strength
10,000 in the beginning, probably somewhere between 20,000 and 30,000 at the end	Unknown, but probably significant, as he was able to lead at least 20,000 soldiers for the battle of Ipsus

After the disaster of the Battle of Ipsus, Demetrius I Poliorcetes launched a campaign of raids in the Thracian Chersonese in 300-299 BCE. These raids, directed against Lysimachus, were a last-ditch effort by the Antigonid to rebuild his forces and buy time to avoid complete annihilation.

He contested Lampsacus with Lysimachus and captured it at least twice, without occupying it. During this campaign, Demetrius won skirmishes with his troops and managed to establish a complete blockade of the Hellespont. Aided by the emerging dissensions among the victorious Diadochi of Ipsus, he left the Thracian Chersonese for the Middle East in 299-298 BCE, where he reunited with his former enemy, Seleucus I, to whom he gave his daughter Stratonice in marriage. Overall, his very precarious position was strengthened by this campaign, which restored him among the Diadochian powers and allowed him to rebuild his troops and a portion of his prestige.

== Background ==
The Battle of Ipsus was a disaster for the Antigonids; their army, encountering the combined forces of Seleucus and Lysimachus on the battlefield, was completely destroyed. Demetrius was not a stranger to this defeat: he broke through the enemy lines and advanced decisively against Antiochus, the son of Seleucus, but this cut him off from the main battle, and he had to witness, helplessly, the complete destruction of the Antigonid phalanx and the death of his father. Antigonus I, a central figure in the Wars of the Diadochi and one of the main contenders for Alexander's succession, indeed met his end on the battlefield. Antigonus's death finalized the decisive defeat of the Antigonids and placed Demetrius in a very difficult position.

== Operations ==
=== Flight ===
Geopolitical situation before the Battle of Ipsus

Demetrius assessed the lost situation of the battle and the death of Antigonus, then fled the battlefield. This was a pragmatic choice aimed at preserving the remnants of the available Antigonid power. While the victorious Diadochi gathered to divide Antigonus's lands, Demetrius rushed westward and quickly headed toward Ephesus. Plutarch states that Demetrius had less than ten thousand soldiers remaining, a minimal fraction of the Antigonid forces before the battle. Clearly, Demetrius aimed to extract himself from Anatolia as swiftly as possible; indeed, he found part of his well-preserved fleet in the city, allowing him to reengage in the Hellenistic and Aegean world and to reach the two remaining centers of his power, Athens and Cyprus. Despite the wavering loyalty of his troops, who threatened to plunder the city's temple, Demetrius managed to have them embark without major issues.

Geopolitical situation after the Battle of Ipsus

The subsequent events are difficult to establish, but it seems that Demetrius intended to go to Athens, where part of his fleet remained. However, the city declared that he was no longer welcome. He retrieved his fleet and "solidified" his position somewhat, according to Plutarch, though it is unclear what this entailed—probably a short period of consolidation and administration of the territories still under his control. During this period, he likely went to Corinth to recruit mercenaries, and despite the division of his territories and the loss of Athens, he managed to maintain control over Ephesus, certain cities in Phoenicia, Cyprus, and some islands in the Aegean Sea. In Ephesus, specifically, he thwarted a betrayal attempt by the leader of the garrison during this period.

He then set out for the Thracian Chersonese and began to ravage the territories of Lysimachus.

=== Strategic choices and Campaign ===
The fact that Demetrius chose to attack Lysimachus, specifically targeting the Thracian Chersonese, was a strategically sound decision by the Epigone. He likely selected this Diadochus because Lysimachus had inherited a significant portion of the former Antigonid territories in Anatolia. Furthermore, Lysimachus, being the most isolated and the most dangerous to his peers, made an ideal target for Demetrius. Demetrius and Lysimachus also had a long-standing personal rivalry. Additionally, Demetrius could utilize his well-preserved fleet to secure control of the Hellespont, thereby threatening Thrace and obstructing any attempts by Lysimachus to seize Anatolian lands, exploiting the geographical division of Lysimachus's territory between Europe and Asia. This fleet undoubtedly enhanced Demetrius's mobility, and it seems that he crossed the Hellespont with his troops multiple times, capturing Lampsacus at least twice without holding it permanently, indicating his lack of interest in territorial conquest at that moment. At this time, his fleet likely consisted of around 170 auxiliary ships, theoretically allowing him to transport more than 40,000 people, far more than his actual troops.

After disembarking his troops, still vastly outnumbered, he embarked on a campaign of asymmetric warfare while enforcing a complete blockade of the Hellespont and capturing settlements, the only known one being Lampsacus. Demetrius appears to be well-acquainted with this style of warfare, as he was credited with an ambush victory in 311 BCE against a general of Ptolemy, named Cilles. Few details are known about this campaign, making it difficult to reconstruct. However, Demetrius seemed to conduct a series of raids to ravage the territory, possibly to pin Lysimachus down in the region, gradually rebuild his forces and their loyalty, and generally hinder his opponent as much as possible. Polyaenus refers to an episode, considered part of this campaign, where Lysimachus executed five thousand Illyrian soldiers after a defeat against Demetrius, indicating Lysimachus's precarious position to the extent that he feared a revolt among his troops.

It appears that more than financial rewards from looting, with Demetrius still receiving funds from his remaining territories, this campaign was a sort of "forward escape" for prestige. After Ipsus, Demetrius was in grave need of legitimacy; he had to erase the mark of defeat with heroic or victorious deeds to regain legitimacy in the eyes of his troops and subjects before embarking on new conquests. Some elements of the campaign suggest that Demetrius was more interested in the prestige of victories than immediate financial gain, although financial motivation undoubtedly remained a primary concern for the sovereign. This campaign was conducted in parallel with a Thracian revolt against Lysimachus, which is sparsely documented in the sources but sheds significant light on Lysimachus's precarious situation during this period. Notably, Lysimachus received no aid from his former allies.

=== Results ===
Demetrius achieved his war objectives; he managed to impact Lysimachus, to buy time by putting himself out of reach of the other Diadochi while they divided between themselves. Additionally, he succeeded in rebuilding his forces and becoming once again a significant player in the Hellenistic world. The loyalty of his troops was assured once more, and after his campaign, he still retained his significant fleet, with none of his remaining territories lost. Furthermore, he reasserted himself diplomatically, as in 299-298 BCE, Demetrius left the Chersonese for the Middle East to participate in the marriage of his daughter, Stratonice I, to Seleucus I, the former victor of Ipsus. This marriage and alliance served as official testimony to his rehabilitation among the Diadochian powers and paralleled the royal marriages of Lysimachus and Ptolemy, who allied themselves. However, if the campaign was initially intended to be a conquest campaign, which is far from certain, Demetrius failed to conquer the targeted territories.

Overall, this campaign transformed his situation; from a desperate position, he once again became an emerging power in the Hellenistic world and a significant actor. It also demonstrated the resilience that Demetrius displayed during one of the most precarious moments of his career and foreshadowed the tireless character that characterized his Greek campaign from 297 to 287 BCE.
