= Second siege of Babylon =

Military action in 310 BC

Siege of Baylon
- Part of the Babylonian War
Date	310 BC
Location	Babylon
Result	Seleucid victory

Belligerents
Antigonids	Seleucids

Commanders and leaders
Demetrios; Archelaos	Patrokles

Strength
Initially; 19,000; At the end 6,000	Initially; A few thousands At the end 20,000

Casualties and losses
Moderate; 6,000 captured	Few

The second siege of Babylon took place during the Babylonian War in 310 BC. Antigonid forces under Antigonus's oldest son, Demetrius, besieged the Seleucid garrison of the city of Babylon under the command of Patrocles.

== Prelude ==
In 311 BC Seleucus defeated the Antigonid forces in the satrapy of Babylonia. In response Antigonus sent his son Demetrius with 15,000 infantry and 4,000 cavalry to retake the region. In 310 BC, while Seleucus was campaigning in the east, Demetrius arrived at Babylon. Seleucus had left a small force in the city under the command of an admiral and geographer called Patrocles. The defenders launched guerrilla attacks at the young Antigonid's troops, and Patrocles also managed to hold off Demetrius by using the irrigation canals to flood the area.

== Siege ==
Before Demetrius arrived, Patrocles ordered an evacuation of civilians from the city, then he withdrew with his troops into Babylon’s two citadels. Demetrius capturing the city without opposition besieged the citadels. Eventually, Demetrius´s soldiers manage to capture and plunder one of the citadels. Despite this success Antigonus ordered him back to Asia minor. In 309 BC Demetrius marched back west with the majority of his army, but left Archelaus, one of his trusted generals, with 6,000 troops and orders to take the remaining citadel. Meanwhile Seleucus, who had refused to be distracted from his eastern campaign, now returned and started to recover Babylonia.

== Aftermath ==
Seleucus, after an extensive campaign against Archelaus, which seemed to have caused widespread devastation, reconquered the satrapy. In the end Archelaus's troops surrendered while Archelaus managed to escape to Antigoneia, in Syria.

== Sources ==
https://www.livius.org/articles/concept/diadochi/diadochi-6-the-babylonian-war/

https://www.livius.org/sources/content/diodorus/demetrius-babylonian-campaign/

Antigonus the One-Eyed: Greatest of the Successors by Jeff champions

Alexander's Heirs: The Age of the Successors by Edward M Anson

https://www.livius.org/articles/concept/diadochi/diadochi-6-the-babylonian-war/

Richard A. Billows, Antigonos the One Eyed and the Creation of the Hellenistic State, pp 141-142

Diodorus Siculus, Bibliotheca Historica, book XIX

Plutarch, Life of Demetrius, 7,2-3

Babylonian Chronicles, rev. lines 34-41

Patrocles (geographer)
