= Ipsus =

Ancient city in Phrygia

Coordinates: 38°51′22″N 30°32′57″E

Ipsus or Ipsos (Ancient Greek: Ἴψος) or Ipsous (Ἴψους), was a town of ancient Phrygia a few miles below Synnada. The place itself never was of any particular note, but it is celebrated in history for the great battle fought in its plains, in 301 BCE, by the aged Antigonus and his son Demetrius against the combined forces of Cassander, Lysimachus, and Seleucus, in which Antigonus lost his conquests and his life. From Hierocles and the Acts of Councils, we learn that in the seventh and eighth centuries it was the see of a Christian bishop. No longer the seat of a residential bishop, Ipsus remains a titular see of the Roman Catholic Church.

Its site is located near Çayırbağ in Asiatic Turkey.
