= Battle of Ipsus =

301 BC battle of the Wars of the Diadochi in Phrygia (modern Turkey)

- Part of the Wars of the Diadochi
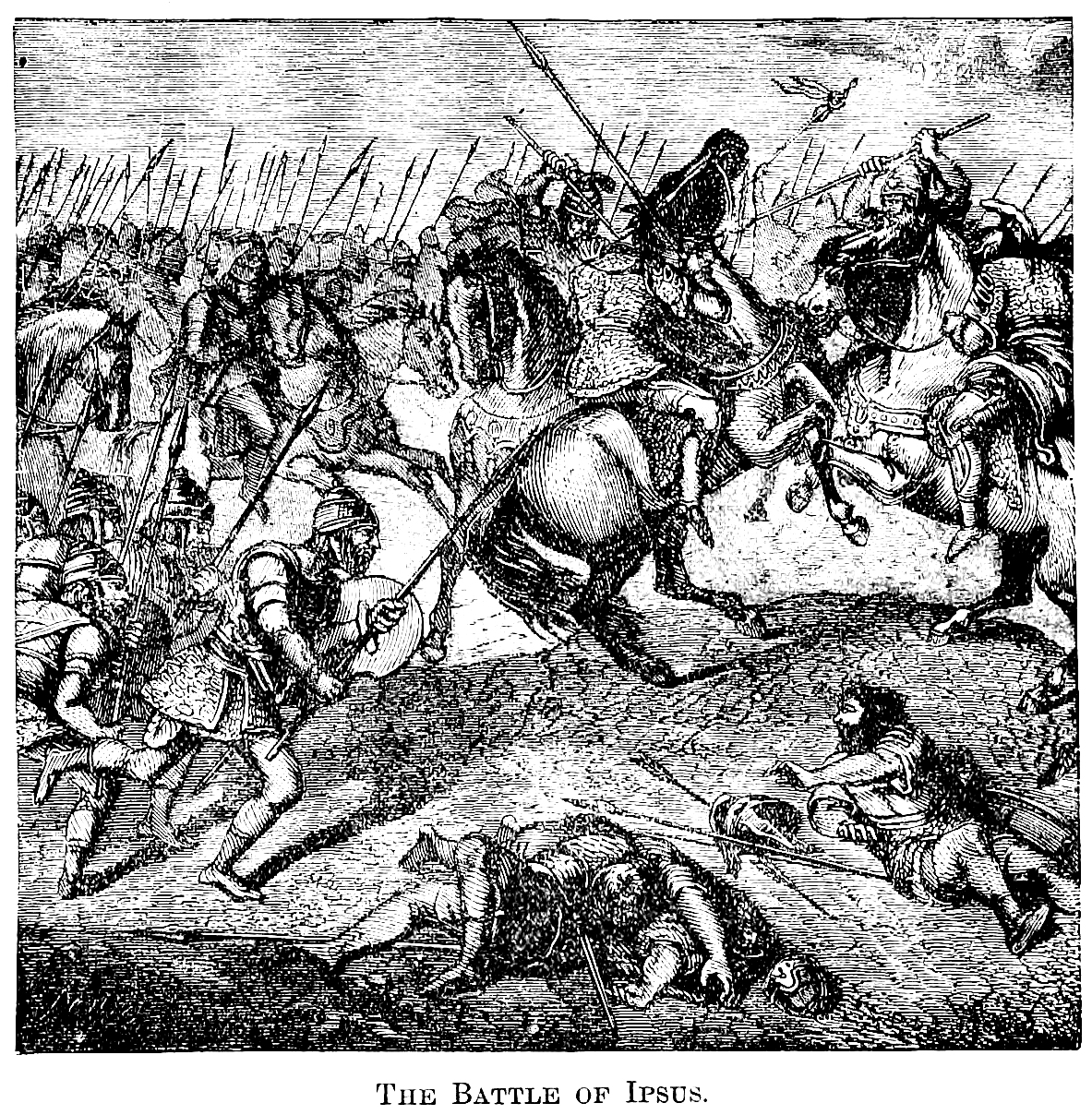
- The Battle of Ipsus in 301 BC. 19th century engraving.
Date	301 BC
Location	Ipsus, Phrygia (modern-day Çayırbağ, Afyonkarahisar, Turkey) 38.95°N 30.99°E
Result	Anti-Antigonid coalition victory

Belligerents
Antigonid dynasty	Anti-Antigonid coalition: Seleucid Empire; Lysimachid Thrace; Antipatrid Macedon

Commanders and leaders
Antigonos I †; Demetrios I Pyrrhos I	Seleukos I Lysimachos; Antiochos; Prepelaos; Pleistarchos

Strength
70,000 infantry; 10,000 cavalry; 75 elephants; (Plutarch)	64,000 infantry; 15,000 cavalry; 500 Indian elephants; 120 scythed chariots; (Plutarch)

Casualties and losses
All but 5,000 infantry and 4,000 cavalry (Plutarch)	Unknown
- Location of the Battle of Ipsus. Battle of Ipsus (Turkey)

The Battle of Ipsus (Ancient Greek: Ἱψός) was fought between the successors of Alexander the Great (referred to as the Diadochi) in 301 BC near the town of Ipsus in Phrygia.

Antigonus I Monophthalmus, the Greek Macedonian ruler of large parts of Asia, and his son Demetrius were pitted against the coalition of three other successors of Alexander: Cassander, ruler of Macedon; Lysimachus, ruler of Thrace; and Seleucus I Nicator, ruler of Babylonia and Persia.

== Sources ==
Diodorus Siculus is the principal source for the history of the Diadochi, in his 'Library of history' (Bibliotheca historica). Diodorus is often derided by modern historians for his style and inaccuracies, but he preserves many details of the ancient period found nowhere else. Diodorus worked primarily by epitomizing the works of other historians, omitting many details where they did not suit his purpose, which was to illustrate moral lessons from history. However, since Diodorus provides the only continuous narrative for the history of the Diadochi, we have no alternative but to rely on his account. Unfortunately, from book XXI onwards (301 BC), including the actual Battle of Ipsus, the Bibliotheca only exists in fragments. Nevertheless, Diodorus provides extensive details of the Fourth War of the Diadochi leading up to Ipsus. It is generally thought that Diodorus's source for much of this period was the now-lost history of the Diadochi written by Hieronymus of Cardia. Hieronymus was a friend of Eumenes, and later became a member of the Antigonid court; he was therefore very much familiar and contemporary with the events he described, and possibly a direct eyewitness to some.

The only full description of the battle available is in Plutarch's Life of Demetrius. Plutarch was writing some 400 years after the events in question, and is therefore a secondary source, but he often names his sources, which allows some degree of verification of his statements. Plutarch was also primarily interested in moral lessons from history, rather than actually detailing history in depth, and thus his description of the battle does not go into great detail.

== Background ==
In the aftermath of the Second War of the Diadochi (315 BC), the aging satrap Antigonus I Monophthalmus had been left in undisputed control of the Asian territories of the Macedonian empire (Asia Minor, Syria and the vast eastern satrapies). This left Antigonus in prime position to claim overall rule over the Macedonian empire. Antigonus's growing power alarmed the other major Successors, resulting in the eruption of the Third War of the Diadochi in 314 BC, in which Antigonus faced a coalition of Cassander (ruler of Macedonia), Lysimachus (ruler of Thrace) and Ptolemy (ruler of Egypt). This war ended in a compromise peace in 311 BC, after which Antigonus attacked Seleucus, who was attempting to re-establish himself in the eastern Satrapies of the empire. The resulting Babylonian War lasted from 311 to 309 BC, and resulted in defeat for Antigonus, allowing Seleucus to re-claim the satrapy of Babylonia and overlordship of the territories to the east.

While Antigonus was distracted elsewhere, Ptolemy had been expanding his power into the Aegean Sea and to Cyprus. Antigonus thus resumed the war with Ptolemy in 308 BC, beginning the Fourth War of the Diadochi. Antigonus sent his son Demetrius to regain control of Greece, and in 307 BC he took Athens, expelling Demetrius of Phaleron, Cassander's governor, and proclaiming the city free again. Demetrius then turned his attention to Ptolemy, invading Cyprus and defeating Ptolemy's fleet at the Battle of Salamis-in-Cyprus. In the aftermath of this victory, Antigonus and Demetrius both assumed the crown of Macedon, in which they were shortly followed by Ptolemy, Seleucus, Lysimachus, and eventually Cassander.

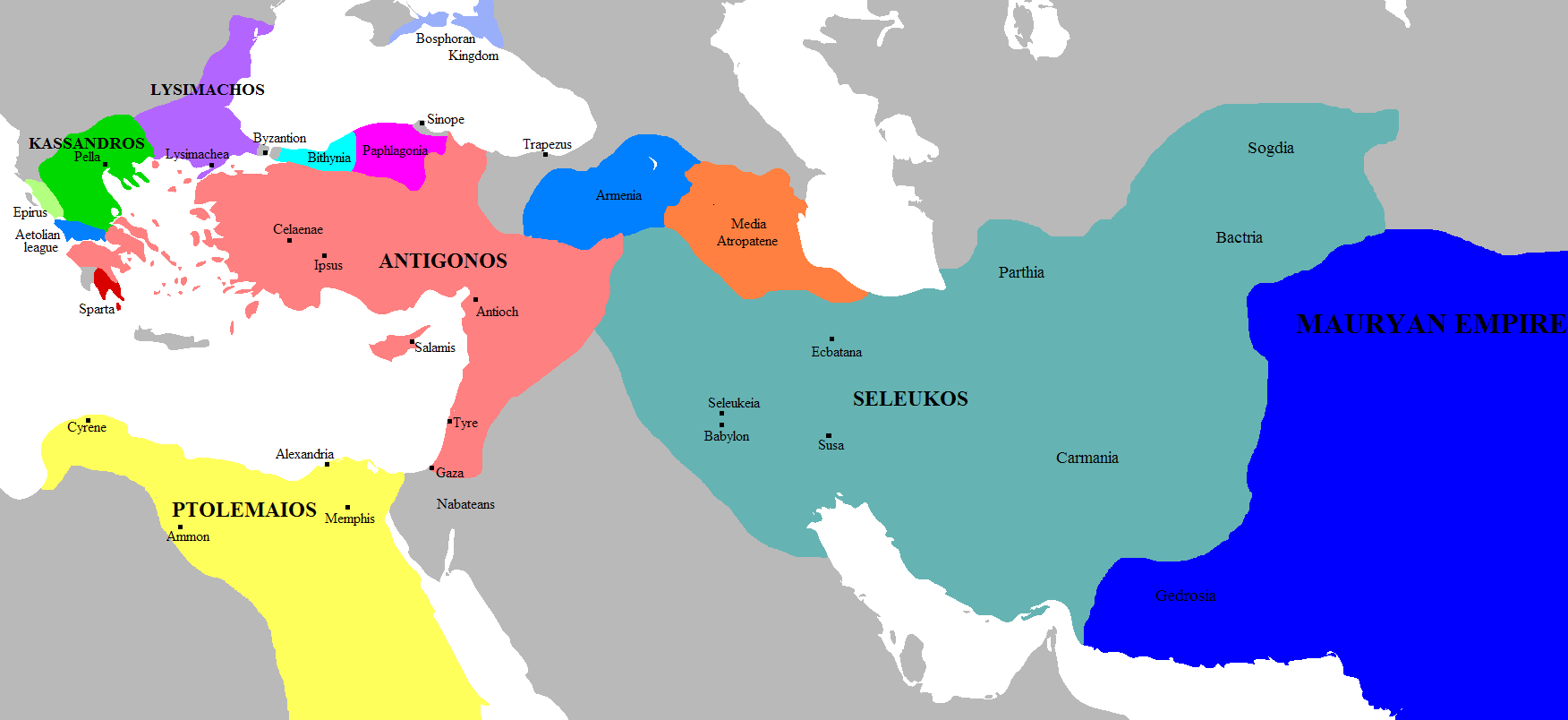
The successor kingdoms before the battle of Ipsus, 303 BC.

In 306, Antigonus attempted to invade Egypt, but storms prevented Demetrius's fleet from supplying him, and he was forced to return home. With Cassander and Ptolemy both weakened, and Seleucus still occupied by attempting to assert his control over the East, Antigonus and Demetrius now turned their attention to Rhodes, which was besieged by Demetrius's forces in 305 BC. The island was reinforced by troops from Ptolemy, Lysimachus, and Cassander. Ultimately, the Rhodians reached a compromise with Demetrius – they would support Antigonus and Demetrius against all enemies, save their ally Ptolemy. Ptolemy took the title of Soter ("Savior") for his role in preventing the fall of Rhodes, but the victory was ultimately Demetrius's, as it left him with a free hand to attack Cassander in Greece. Demetrius thus returned to Greece and set about liberating the cities of Greece, expelling Cassander's garrisons, and the pro-Antipatrid oligarchies. This occupied much of Demetrius's efforts in 303 and 302 BC.

Seeing that Demetrius's war effort was aimed at destroying his power in Greece, and ultimately in Macedonia, Cassander tried to come to terms with Antigonus. However, Antigonus rejected these advances, intent on forcing Cassander's complete surrender. Cassander therefore held counsel with Lysimachus, and they agreed on a joint strategy that included sending envoys to Ptolemy and Seleucus, asking them to join in combatting the Antigonid threat. Seeking to take the initiative, Cassander sent a significant portion of the Macedonian army under Prepelaus to Lysimachus, which was to be used in joint operations in Asia Minor. Meanwhile, Cassander took the rest of the Macedonian army into Thessaly to confront Demetrius.

== Prelude ==
Lysimachus crossed over the Hellespont in 302 BC, intending to take advantage of Antigonus's absence in Syria by overrunning Asia Minor. The cities of Lampsakos and Parion submitted to him, but he had to storm Sigeion, after which he installed a garrison there. He then sent Prepelaus with 7,000 men to attack Aeolis and Ionia, while he besieged Abydos. This siege was unsuccessful however, since Demetrius sent the city reinforcements from Greece by sea. Lysimachus instead went on to win over Hellespontine Phrygia, and then captured the major administrative centre of Synnada. Meanwhile, Prepelaus captured Adramyttion, Ephesos, Teos, and Colophon; he could not however capture Erythrae or Clazomenae, again due to sea-borne reinforcements. Finally, Prepelaus moved inland and captured Sardis, another major administrative centre.

When Antigonus received news of the invasion, he abandoned preparations for a great festival to be held in Antigoneia, and quickly began to march his army northwards from Syria, through Cilicia, Cappadocia, Lycaonia, and into Phrygia. Lysimachus, hearing of the approach of Antigonus's army, held counsel with his officers, and decided to avoid open battle until Seleucus's arrival. The allies thus defended their camp with entrenchments and palisades, and when Antigonus arrived offering battle, they remained within the camp. Antigonus therefore moved to cut off the allies' provisions, forcing Lysimachus to abandon the camp and make a night-time march of some 40 miles to Dorylaion. There, the allies built a new, triple-palisaded camp amongst the hills, with relatively easy access to food and water. Antigonus followed closely behind, and laid siege to the allied camp, bringing up catapults for the assault. Lysimachus sent sorties to try to disrupt the siege-works, but the Antigonid forces always ended with the upper hand in ensuing skirmishes. With the siege works nearing completion and food running low, Lysimachus decided to abandon the camp, and marched away during a night-time storm. Antigonus again attempted to follow, but as winter approached with further rain, conditions became difficult, and he abandoned pursuit and dispersed his men into winter quarters instead. The allied army marched on into Bithynia and went into winter quarters in and around the city of Heraclea.

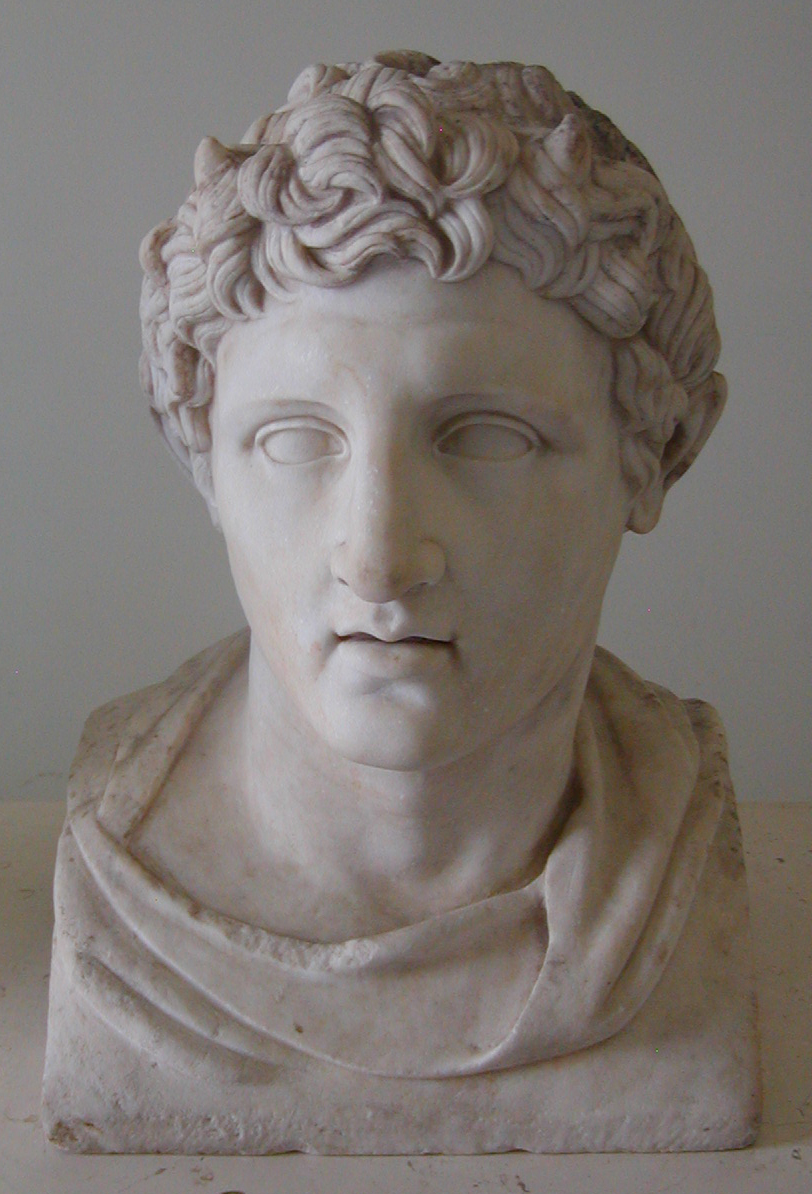
Demetrius, son of Antigonus

Whilst settling his army for the winter, Antigonus heard the news that Seleucus was en route from the eastern satrapies to support Lysimachus. He therefore dispatched messengers to Demetrius, ordering him to bring his army over to Asia to reinforce the Antigonid forces. Demetrius had in the meantime continued his campaign in Greece, and although Cassander had blocked the land-passes, Demetrius had entered Thessaly by sea. There had followed a somewhat inconsequential campaign of manoeuvre between the two armies in Thessaly, before Demetrius received his father's messages asking for reinforcements. Demetrius thus hastily arranged a truce with Cassander, and took his army by sea across the Aegean to Ephesos. He recaptured Ephesos, and marched north to the Hellespont, where he established a strong garrison and fleet to prevent European reinforcements reaching the allied army in Asia. Demetrius then also dispersed his army into winter quarters.

In the absence of Demetrius, Cassander now felt able to send further reinforcements to Lysimachus, under the command of his brother, Pleistarchus. Since Demetrius was guarding the easy crossing points at the Hellespont and the Bosphorus, Pleistarchus attempted to ship his men directly across the Black Sea to Heraclea, using the port of Odessos. The men had to be sent in batches due to a lack of ships, and although the first batch arrived safely, the second shipment was intercepted by Demetrius's fleet, and the third wrecked in a storm. Pleistarchus himself narrowly survived the wreck of his command ship, eventually being carried to Heraclea to recuperate over the winter. Similarly, the concentration of Antigonid forces in Asia now made Ptolemy feel secure enough to bring an army out of Egypt to try to conquer Coele Syria. He captured a number of cities, but while laying siege to Sidon, he was brought false reports of an Antigonid victory, and told that Antigonus was marching south into Syria. He thus garrisoned the cities he had captured, and retreated into Egypt. At around the same time, Seleucus appears to have finished his march from the east, arriving in Cappadocia with his army, which he then sent into winter quarters.

Diodorus completes book XX of his Library at this point, saying that he will describe the battle between the Kings at the start of the next book. However, only fragments remain of books XXI onwards, and although some fragments of his description of the battle do remain, they do not form a coherent narrative. In his description of the battle, Plutarch does not describe the preliminary manoeuvring that must have occurred in 301 BC before the battle, so it is unclear how events unfolded. Lysimachus and Seleucus were probably anxious to bring Antigonus to battle, since their respective power-centres in Thrace and Babylon were vulnerable in their prolonged absence. The armies eventually met in battle around 50 miles north-east of Synnada, near the village of Ipsus. Antigonus was aware of Ptolemy's raid on Syria the previous year, and thus would have been loath to be cut off from Syria and his capital in Antigonia, and thus moved to intercept the allied army. The exact location of the battle is unknown, but it occurred in a large open plain, well-suited for both the allied preponderance of elephants and the Antigonid superiority in cavalry numbers and training.

== Opposing forces ==
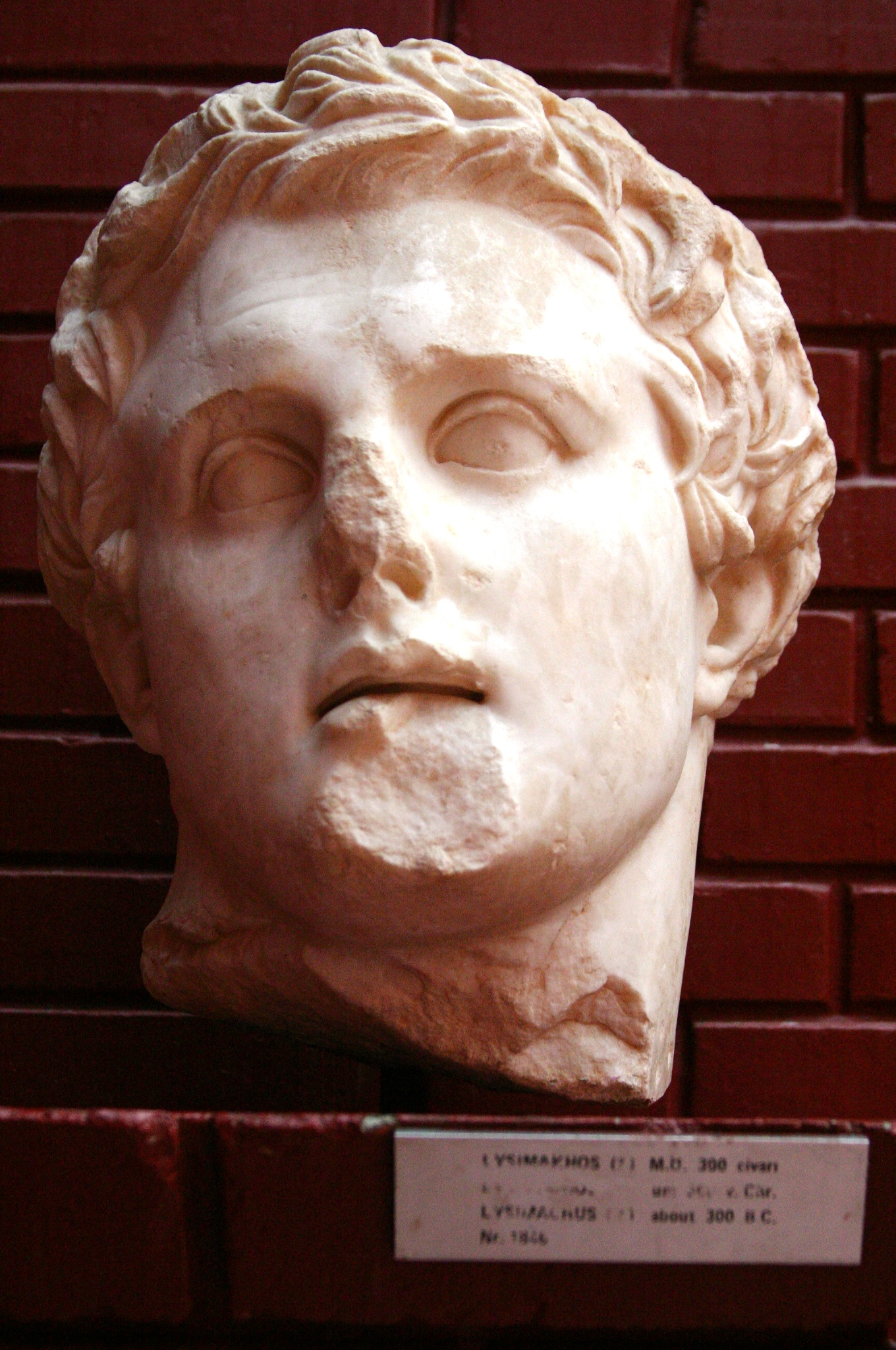
Lysimachus, one of the victors of Ipsus.

=== Antigonids ===
According to Plutarch, Antigonus's army before the battle numbered around 70,000 infantry, 10,000 cavalry and 75 war elephants. The majority of this number were presumably supplied by Antigonus's army that marched from Syria, since Demetrius's army in Greece had no elephants and only 1,500 cavalry. Diodorus claims that Demetrius's had approximately 56,000 infantry in Greece (8,000 Macedonian phalangites, 15,000 mercenaries, 25,000 troops from Greek cities and 8,000 light troops), but it is unclear what proportion of this infantry accompanied him to Asia. Based on other battles between the Diadochi, modern experts estimate that of the 70,000 Antigonid infantry, perhaps 40,000 were phalangites and 30,000 were light troops of various kinds.

=== Allies ===
Plutarch gives a total of 64,000 infantry for the allies, with 10,500 cavalry, 400 elephants and 120 scythed chariots. Diodorus claims that Seleucus brought 20,000 infantry, 12,000 cavalry (including mounted archers), 480 Indian elephants and more than a hundred scythed chariots with him from the eastern satrapies. Those war elephants were given to Seleucus as a gift from Mauryan emperor Chandragupta Maurya after Seleucid Mauryan war and eventually forming a marriage alliance between two empires. The numbers of elephants and chariots supposed to be present at the battle are therefore relatively consistent between these sources. However, Seleucus's cavalry component according to Diodorus is alone larger than Plutarch's claims for the whole allied cavalry, and Lysimachus must have had at least some cavalry; he sent at least 1,000 horsemen with Prepelaus the previous year. Modern experts thus estimate the total number of allied cavalry at 15,000. Of the 44,000 non-Seleucid infantry, it is unclear what proportion were supplied by Cassander and Lysimachus respectively. Cassander sent 12,000 men under Pleistarchus, of which two-thirds were lost in crossing the Black Sea, but it is not clear how many men were in the initial dispatch of troops sent under Prepelaus. Modern experts estimate that, of the allies' total infantry, perhaps 30,000–40,000 were phalangites, with the remainder being light troop types.

== Strategic and tactical considerations ==
In terms of overall strategy, it is clear that both sides had resolved on battle; for the allies, it represented the best chance of stopping Antigonid expansion, rather than allowing themselves to be defeated piecemeal. For Antigonus, the chance to defeat all his enemies at once could not be passed up, even if he would have preferred to defeat them individually. However, little is known about the specific strategic considerations facing the two sides before the battle, as the precise circumstances and location of the engagement remain uncertain. As mentioned above, it has been suggested that the allied army was trying to cut Antigonus's lines of communication with Syria, in order to prompt him into battle, but this is only one of several possible scenarios.

Tactically, both sides faced the common problem of the wars fought amongst the Successors; how to defeat an army equipped in the same manner and using the same basic tactics. The Diadochi seem to have been inherently conservative, and continued to favour a strong attack with cavalry on the right wing of the battle-line (tactics commonly used by both Philip and Alexander) as the principal tactical thrust – even though they must have been aware of the likelihood their opponents would perform the same maneuver on the opposite side of the battlefield. When armies were numerically even and deploying the same tactics, gaining a clear advantage was difficult. The use of novel weapons, such as war elephants and scythed chariots, to change the tactical balance was one approach used by the Diadochi, but such innovations were readily copied. Thus, both sides at Ipsus had war elephants, although thanks to Seleucus, the allies were able to field an unusually high number, in addition to scythed chariots. Both sides therefore sought an open battlefield; the allies in order to use their elephants to full potential, and the Antigonids to allow full use of their strong cavalry arm. For the Antigonids, strong in both infantry and cavalry, the tactical situation was straightforward, and followed the template Successor tactic of a massive cavalry assault on the right wing. For the allies, weaker in infantry, the tactics would have been to maximize their overwhelming superiority in elephants, though it is not clear exactly how they intended to do this. Nevertheless, the elephants played a pivotal role in the battle.

== Battle ==
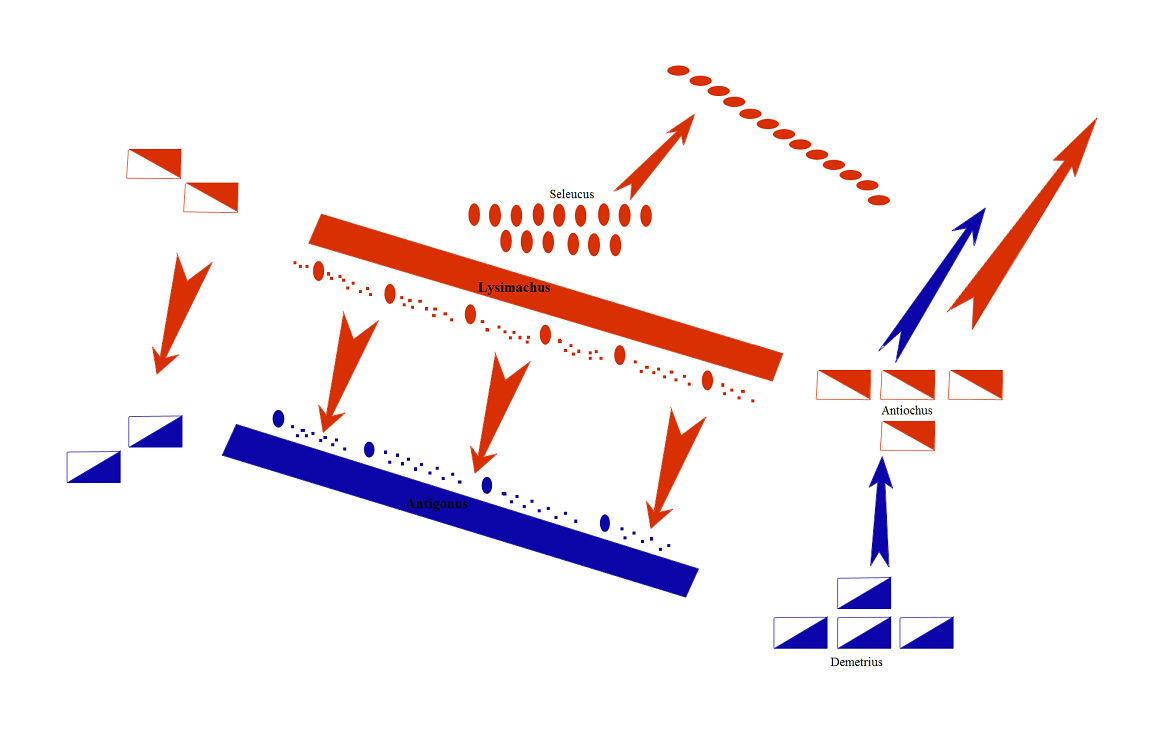
Schematic diagram of the Battle of Ipsus, 301 BC

=== Deployment ===
Both sides probably deployed their troops in a standard Macedonian formation, with the phalanx of heavy infantry in the centre of the battle line. In front, and to the sides of the phalanx, light infantry were deployed to act as skirmishers and to protect the flanks of the phalanx; cavalry was split between the two wings. In the Antigonid line, Demetrius commanded the best of the cavalry, stationed on the right wing. Antigonus, with his personal bodyguard, was positioned in the centre behind the phalanx. The 75 elephants were deployed in front of the battle-line with their infantry guards.

The situation with the allied deployment is less clear. Plutarch states that Seleucus's son Antiochus was in command of the cavalry on the left wing, traditionally the weaker wing in the Macedonian system, intended only to skirmish. However, it has been suggested that on this occasion the allied cavalry were evenly split between the two wings. We do not know who commanded the right wing, nor where Lysimachus, Seleucus or Pleistarchus were stationed. It is clear that some of Seleucus's elephants were placed in front of the battle line, but not how many, though a figure of 100 is often suggested. It has been suggested that Seleucus retained command of the majority of his elephants in a tactical reserve, but the use of such a large reserve would have been unprecedented in battles amongst the successors. Furthermore, it would have meant shunning an opportunity to deploy the major tactical advantage held by the allies. As modern sources point out, understanding this 'elephant problem' is key to understanding the outcome of the battle, but the ancient sources do not allow the point to be resolved.

=== Initial phase ===
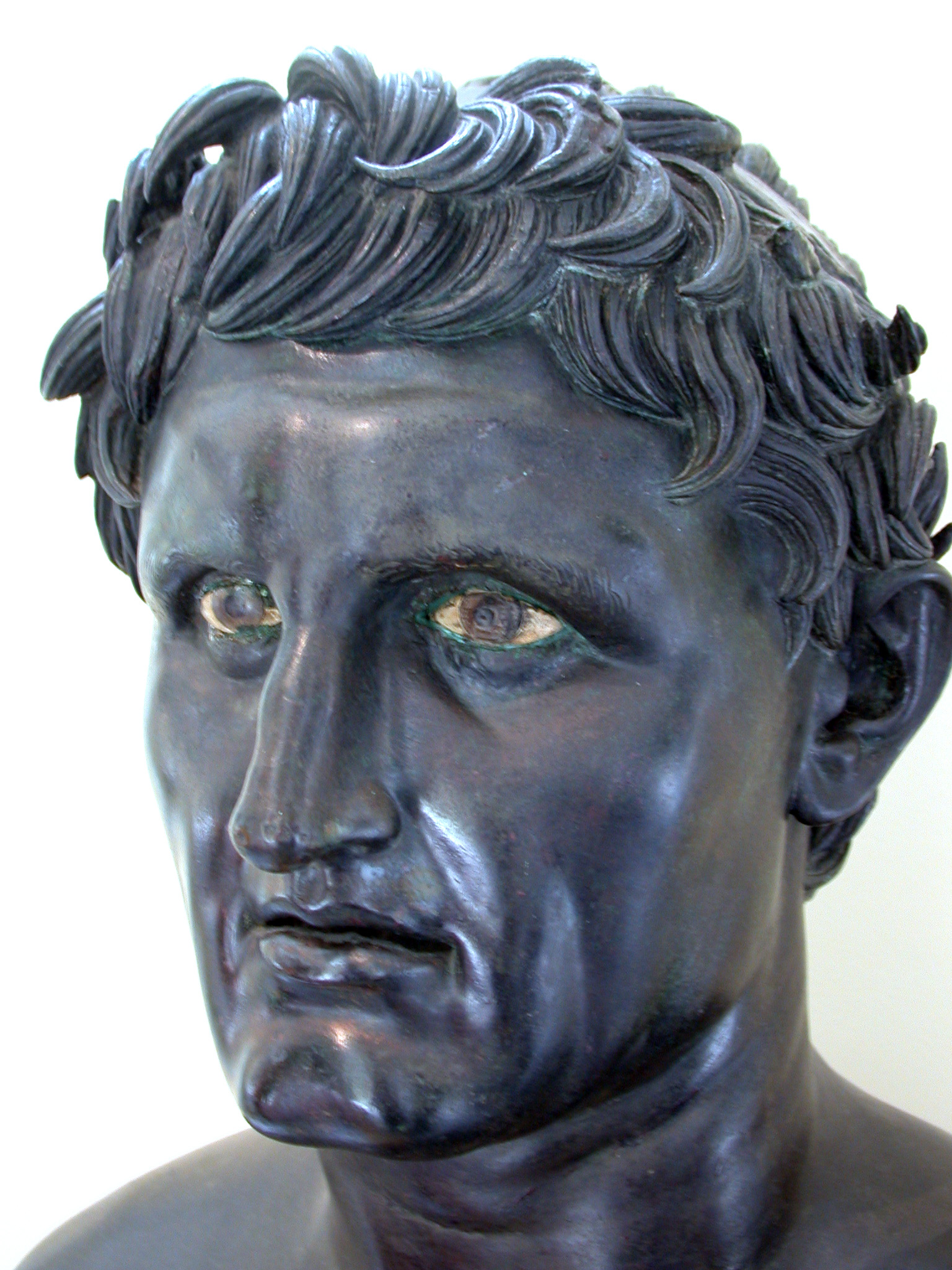
Bust of Seleucus, whose elephants decided the battle

The battle seems to have begun in earnest with a clash of the elephants from both sides. Diodorus says that "the elephants of Antigonus and Lysimachus fought as if nature had matched them equally in courage and strength", suggesting that they were also equal in number (and supporting the idea of a large reserve of elephants on the allied side). Demetrius then launched the principal Antigonid thrust, manoeuvering his cavalry around the elephants and attacking the allied cavalry under Antiochus. Plutarch says that Demetrius "fought brilliantly and routed his enemy". However it is also clear that Demetrius allowed the pursuit of the routed allied cavalry to go too far, resulting in his men becoming isolated from the battlefield.

=== Second phase ===
It is not explicitly stated by Plutarch, but it has been assumed that the two phalanxes engaged each other during the battle. If this was the case, then the Antigonid strategy would have been for Demetrius to take his cavalry and attack the rear of the allied phalanx, or, alternatively, to return to station on the right wing and protect the Antigonid phalanx's flank. However, Demetrius found himself unable to return to the battlefield because of the deployment of 300 elephants in his path. The ancient sources repeatedly emphasise the effect of elephants on horses, which are alarmed by the smell and noise of elephants and are loath to approach them. Demetrius would not have been able to take his horses through the line of elephants, nor manoeuvre around such a large quantity of elephants. This 'elephant manoeuvre' was the decisive moment in the battle, but it is not clear how it came about; Plutarch only says that "the [allied] elephants were thrown in his way". If the elephants had indeed been held in reserve, then it might have been relatively straightforward to deploy them, but as discussed, it is not clear why so many elephants would have been held in reserve. However, it is also possible that the deployment of the elephants was a piece of improvisation during the battle, though moving such a large number of elephants in such a coordinated manoeuvre in the middle of the battle would have been difficult. Since he was the only allied commander with significant experience of handling elephants, it has been assumed that Seleucus was responsible for this manoeuvre.

With Demetrius now isolated from the battlefield, the Antigonid phalanx was exposed on its right flank. Plutarch describes what followed:

Seleucus, observing that his opponents' phalanx was unprotected by cavalry, took measures accordingly. He did not actually charge upon them, but kept them in fear of a charge by continually riding around them, thus giving them an opportunity to come over to his side. And this was what actually came to pass.

— Plutarch, Demetrius 29, 3

The Antigonid phalanx and Allied phalanx engaged in a stiff and chaotic fight.

This move against the Antigonid right flank probably involved detaching cavalry from the allies own right wing, including Seleucus's horse-archers, who could rain down missiles on the immobile phalanx. The morale of the troops appears to have collapsed, and it seems that some of the heavy infantry either defected to the allied side or otherwise fled. Antigonus, stationed in the centre, tried to rally his men, hoping for Demetrius's return. However, he was gradually surrounded by allied infantry and eventually killed by several javelins thrown by allied skirmishers. With the death of its commander, the Antigonid battle-line dissolved, and the battle effectively ended.

== Aftermath ==
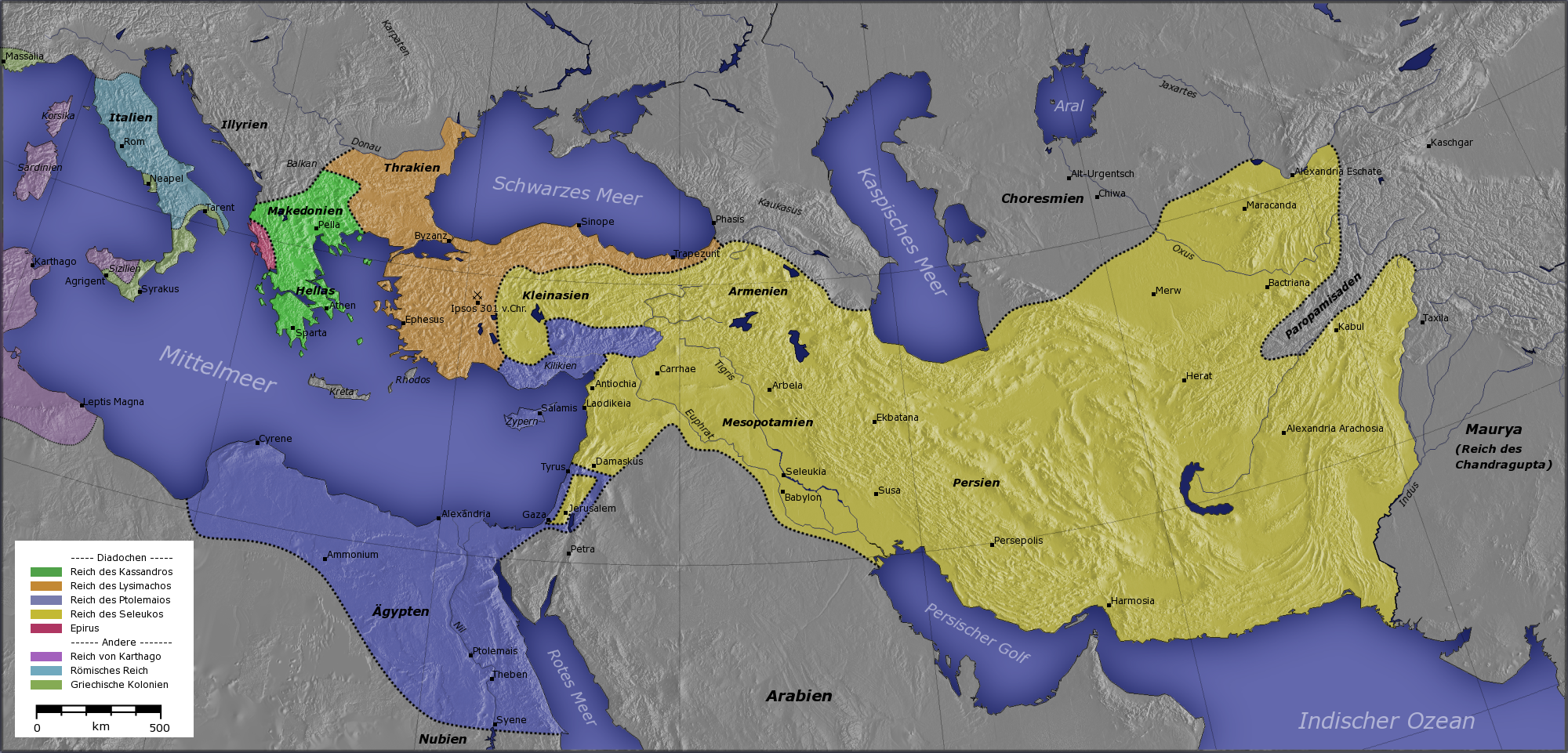
Kingdoms of the Diadochi after the battle of Ipsus, c. 301 BC. Kingdom of Seleucus Other diadochi Kingdom of Cassander Kingdom of Lysimachus Kingdom of Ptolemy Epirus

From the wreck of the Antigonid army and the death of his father, Demetrius managed to recover 5,000 infantry and 4,000 cavalry, and escaped with them to Ephesos. Despite the expectation that he would raid the Ephesian treasury, Demetrius instead immediately set sail for Greece "putting his chief remaining hopes in Athens". However, he was to be disappointed; the Athenians had voted not to allow any of the kings into Athens. Concealing his wrath, he asked the Athenians for the return of his ships that were moored there, and then sailed on to the Isthmus of Corinth. He found that everywhere his garrisons were being expelled, and his erstwhile allies defecting to the other kings. He left Pyrrhus of Epirus (at that time part of the Antigonid faction) in charge of the Antigonid cause in Greece, and himself sailed to the Thracian Chersonesos.

The last chance to reunite the Alexandrine Empire had already been passed when Antigonus lost the Babylonian War and two thirds of his empire. Ipsus confirmed this failure. As Paul K. Davis writes, "Ipsus was the high point of the struggle among Alexander the Great's successors to create an international Hellenistic empire, which Antigonus failed to do." Instead, the empire was carved up between the victors, with Ptolemy retaining Egypt, Seleucus expanding his power to eastern Asia Minor, and Lysimachus receiving the remainder of Asia Minor. Eventually Seleucus would defeat Lysimachus at the Battle of Corupedium in 281 BC, but he was assassinated shortly afterward. Ipsus finalized the breakup of an empire, which may account for its obscurity; despite that, it was still a critical battle in classical history and decided the character of the Hellenistic age.

== Bibliography ==
=== Ancient Sources ===
- Diodorus Siculus – Bibliotheca historica
- Plutarch – Lives (Demetrius)

=== Modern Sources ===
- Bennett, Bob; Roberts, Mike (2008). The Wars of Alexander's Successors 323–281 BC; Volume I: Commanders & Campaigns. Pen and Sword Books. ISBN 978-1-84415-761-7.
- Bennett, Bob; Roberts, Mike (2009). The Wars of Alexander's Successors 323–281 BC; Volume II: Battles and Tactics. Pen and Sword Books. ISBN 978-1-84415-924-6.
- Buckler, John (1989). Philip II and the Sacred War. Brill Archive. ISBN 90-04-09095-9.
- Cawkwell, George (1978). Philip II of Macedon. Faber & Faber. ISBN 0-571-10958-6.
- Davis, Paul K. (1999). 100 Decisive Battles from Ancient Times to the Present: The World's Major Battles and How They Shaped History. Oxford University Press. ISBN 0-19-514366-3.
- Green, Peter (2008). Alexander the Great and the Hellenistic Age. Phoenix. ISBN 978-0-7538-2413-9.
- Green, Peter (2006). Diodorus Siculus – Greek history 480–431 BC: the alternative version (translated by Peter Green). University of Texas Press. ISBN 0-292-71277-4.
