= Battle of the 25 of Abu =

Battle in 309 BC

- Part of the Babylonian War
Date	10 August 309 BC
Location	Road between Babylon and Susa
Result	Seleucid victory
Territorial changes	Seleucus is recognised as the ruler of Babylonia, Elam and Media

Belligerents
Seleucids	Antigonids

Commanders and leaders
Seleukos	Antigonos

Strength
25,000	40,000–50,000

Casualties and losses
Unknown	Unknown but probably heavy

The battle of the 25 of Abu (10 of August) of 309 B.C. in an unknown location between Babylon and Susa, was the decisive and final clash of the Babylonian war. It ended in a Seleucid victory, and the establishment of the Seleucid kingdom.

== Background ==
Seleucus had retaken Babylon, sometime between 312 and 311 B.C. He had been the province's satrap before, but was forced to leave, fearing Antigonus' increasing power and cruelty. The Antigonids made several attempts to retake the "gateway" to the rich eastern satrapies, but ended in failure. Antigonus made peace with the other diadochi (Ptolemy, Cassander and Lysimachus) and marched to Babylon with an army of 75,000 according to some sources, Seleucus then decided to wage a guerilla war, but Antigonus responded by pillaging and razing the territory, finally forcing Seleucus to face him on open ground, with a significantly smaller force.

== Battle ==
When the two armies met they fought an inconclusive engagement, both retired to their camps for the night; but whereas Antigonus's army disarmed and went to sleep, Seleucus ordered his men to dine and rest in full armor and in their ranks. The next morning, as the sun rose from the backs of the already deployed Seleucid phalanx, they began their advance and caught the enemy by surprise, overwhelming the enemy and routing his army. Antigonus managed to escape and gave up on the idea of reconquering the upper satrapies leaving the east to Seleucus.

== Sources ==
- "BCHP 3 (Diadochi Chronicle) - Livius". www.livius.org.
- "Diadochi 6: The Babylonian War - Livius". www.livius.org.
- Antigonus the One-Eyed: Greatest of the Successors by Jeff Champions
- Wheatley, Pat (January 2002). "Antigonus Monophthalmus in Babylonia, 310-308 B. C.". Journal of Near Eastern Studies. 61 (1): 39–47. doi:10.1086/468977. ISSN 0022-2968. S2CID 162034921.
- Richard A. Billows, Antigonos the One-Eyed and the Creation of the Hellenistic State.
