= Demetrius I Poliorcetes =

King of Macedon (294–288 BC)

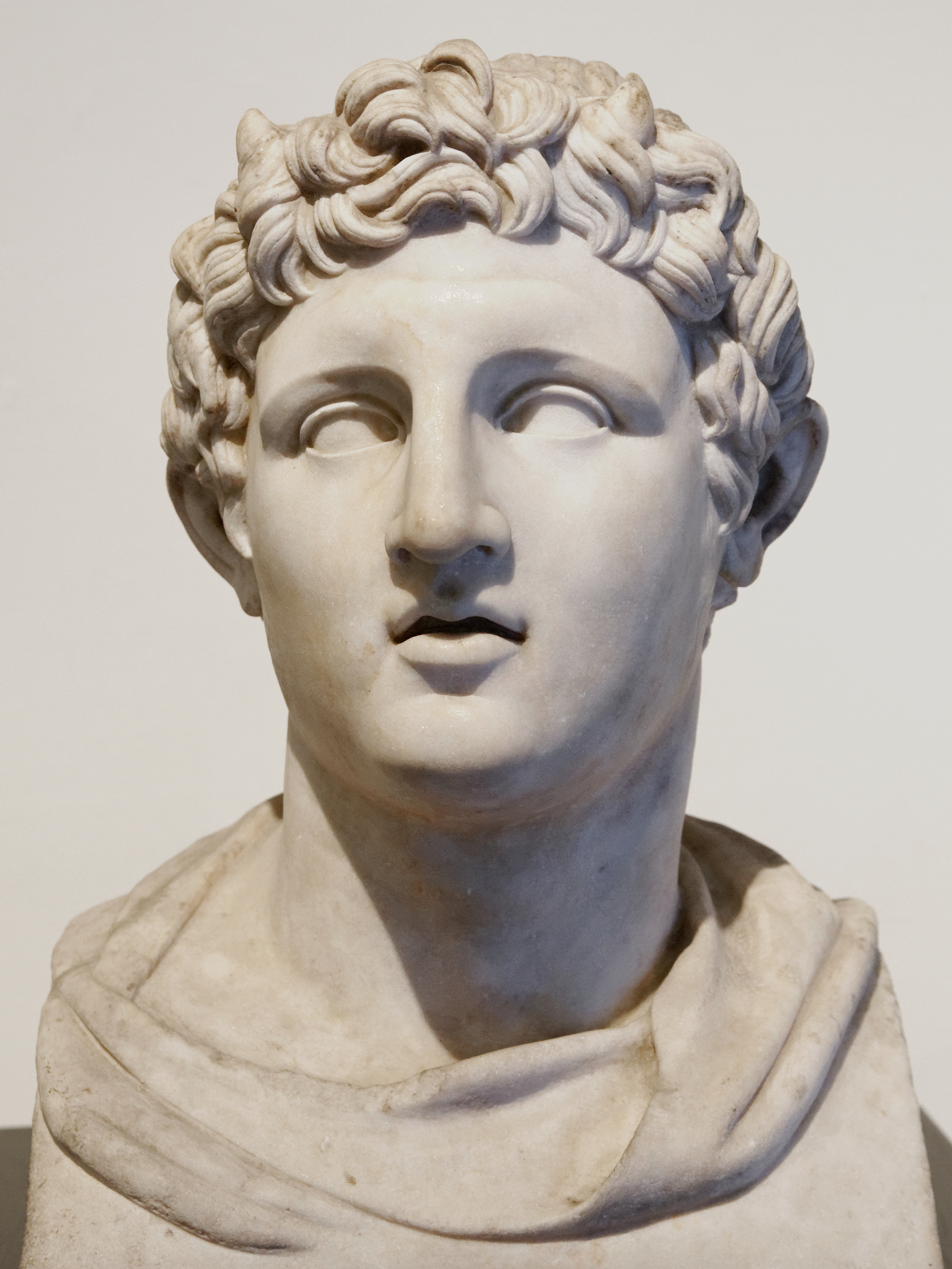
- Marble bust of Demetrius I Poliorcetes. Roman copy from 1st century AD of a Greek original from 3rd century BC.

King of Macedonia
- Reign: 294–288 BC
- Predecessor: Antipater I of Macedon
- Successor: Lysimachus and Pyrrhus of Epirus

Hegemon of the Hellenic League
- Reign: 304 BC
- Predecessor: Alexander the Great
- Successor: Antigonus III Doson
- Born: 337 BC
- Died: 283 BC (aged 53–54)
- Spouse: Phila; Eurydice of Athens; Deidamia I of Epirus; Lanassa; Ptolemais
- Issue: Stratonice of Syria; Antigonus II Gonatas; Demetrius the Fair
- House: Antigonid dynasty
- Father: Antigonus I Monophthalmus
- Mother: Stratonice
- Religion
- Military career
- Conflicts: Wars of the Diadochi; Second War of the Diadochi; Battle of Paraitakene; Battle of Gabiene; Third War of the Diadochi; Antigonid Nabataean Confrontations; Second Antigonid Nabataean Confrontation; Battle of Gaza; Battle of Myus; Babylonian War; Second siege of Babylon; Fourth War of the Diadochi; Battle of Salamis; Siege of Rhodos; Battle of Ipsus; Campaign of the Chersonese; The Struggle over Macedon; Siege of Thebes; Epirote-Macedonian War of 289 BC; Battle of Aetolia; Macedonian Campaign; Siege of Athens

Demetrius I Poliorcetes (/dɪˈmiːtriəs pɒliɔːrˈsiːtiːz/; Greek: Δημήτριος Πολιορκητής, Dēmḗtrios Poliorkētḗs, lit. 'the Besieger of Cities'; 337–283 BC) was a Macedonian Greek nobleman and military leader who became king of Asia between 306 and 301 BC, and king of Macedon between 294 and 288 BC. A member of the Antigonid dynasty, he was the son of its founder, Antigonus I Monophthalmus, and his wife Stratonice, as well as the first member of the family to rule Macedon in Hellenistic Greece.

In 307 BC, Demetrius successfully ousted Cassander's governor of Athens and after defeating Ptolemy I at the Battle of Salamis (306 BC) he gave his father the title of basileus ("king") over a land spanning from the Aegean Sea to the Middle East. He acquired the title Poliorcetes ("the besieger") after the unsuccessful siege of Rhodes in 305. While Antigonus I and Demetrius planned a revival of the Hellenic League with themselves as dual hegemons, a coalition of the diadochi; Cassander, Seleucus I, Ptolemy I, and Lysimachus defeated the two at the Battle of Ipsus in 301 BC, in which Antigonus I was killed and the Asian territory of his empire was lost. In 294, Demetrius managed to successfully seize control of Athens and establish himself as king of Macedon. He ruled until 288 when he was eventually driven out by Pyrrhus and Lysimachus and later surrendered to Seleucus I in Cilicia, dying there in 283. After a long period of instability, Demetrius's son, Antigonus II Gonatas, managed to solidify the dynasty in the kingdom and establish its hegemony over much of Hellenistic Greece.

Demetrius was particularly involved in innovations in poliorcetics, and although not all of his sieges were successful—such as the siege of Rhodes—he left his mark on the history of global siege warfare. This was notably through the extensive use of siege engines, the establishment of effective logistical procedures to support sieges on a much larger scale than previously, the widespread use of amphibious warfare, and finally the very quick pace of execution of his sieges. Demetrius also used his skills as a military architect to fortify cities with defensive architectural innovations, such as, notably, Athens, Sicyon and Corinth. He can be considered one of the main Epigoni, the heirs of the Diadochi.

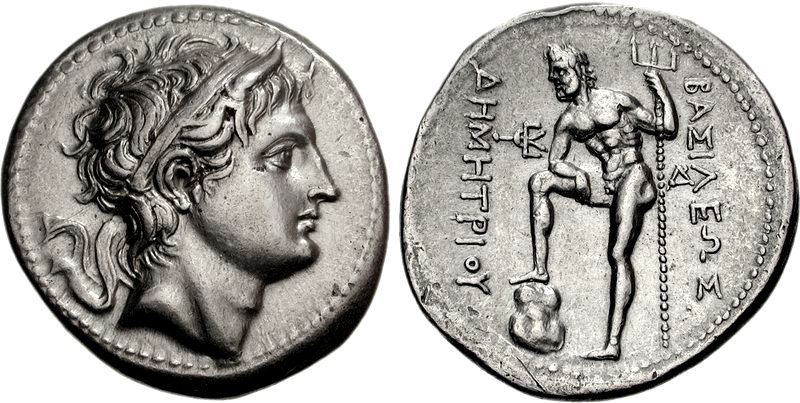
Coin of Demetrius I; Greek inscription reads ΒΑΣΙΛΕΩΣ ΔΗΜΗΤΡΙΟΥ ([coin] of King Demetrius)

== Biography ==
=== Early career ===
Demetrius served with his father, Antigonus I Monophthalmus, during the Second War of the Diadochi. He participated in the Battle of Paraitakene where he commanded the cavalry on the right flank. Despite the Antigonid left flank, commanded by Peithon, being routed, and the center, commanded by Antigonus, being dealt heavy losses at the hands of the famous Silver Shields, Demetrius was victorious on the right, and his success there ultimately prevented the battle from being a complete loss.

Demetrius was again present at the conclusive Battle of Gabiene. Directly after the battle, while Antigonus held the betrayed Eumenes, Demetrius was one of the few who implored his father to spare the Greek successor's life.

At the age of twenty-one Demetrius was left by his father to defend Syria against Ptolemy the son of Lagus. He was defeated at the Battle of Gaza, but soon partially repaired his loss by a victory in the Battle of Myus, against a general of Ptolemy, Cilles. In the spring of 310, he was soundly defeated when he tried to expel Seleucus I Nicator from Babylon; his father was defeated in the autumn. As a result of this Babylonian War, Antigonus lost almost two thirds of his empire: all eastern satrapies fell to Seleucus.

After several campaigns against Ptolemy on the coasts of Cilicia and Cyprus, Demetrius sailed with a fleet of 250 ships to Athens. He freed the city from the power of Cassander and Ptolemy, expelled the garrison which had been stationed there under Demetrius of Phalerum, and besieged and took Munychia (307 BC). After these victories he was worshipped by the Athenians as a tutelary deity under the title of Soter (Greek: Σωτήρ, "Saviour"). At this time Demetrius married Eurydike, an Athenian noblewoman who was reputed to be descendant from Miltiades; she was the widow of Ophellas, Ptolemy's governor of Cyrene. Antigonus sent Demetrius instructions to sail to Cyprus and attack Ptolemy's positions there.

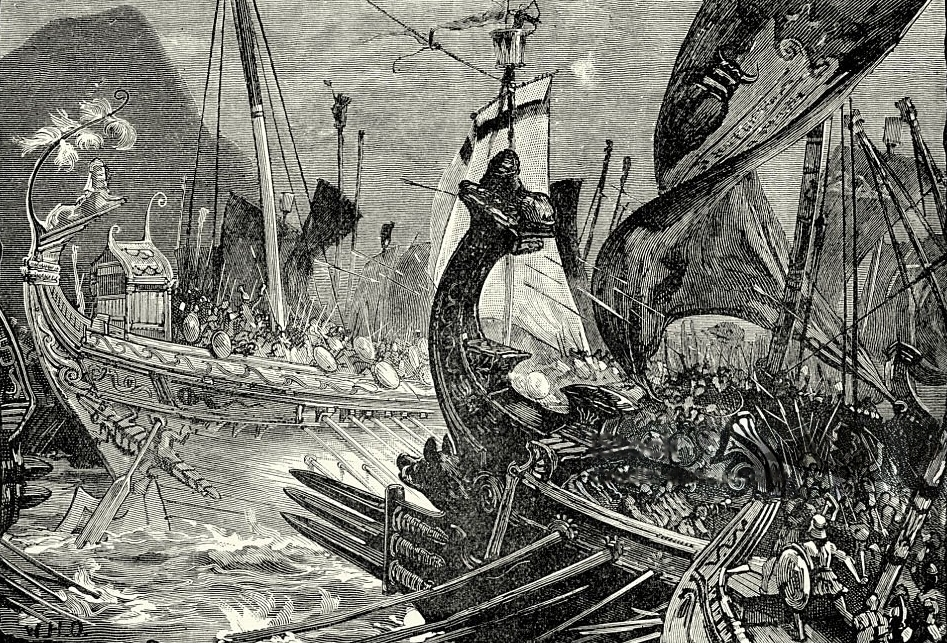
Battle between Ptolemy and Demetrius Poliorcetes off Salamis.

Demetrius sailed from Athens in the spring of 306 BC and in accordance with his father's orders he first went to Caria where he summoned the Rhodians in an unsuccessful attempt to support his naval campaign. In the campaign of 306 BC, he defeated Ptolemy and Menelaus, Ptolemy's brother, in the naval Battle of Salamis, completely destroying the naval power of Ptolemaic Egypt. Demetrius conquered Cyprus in 306 BC, capturing one of Ptolemy's sons. Following the victory, Antigonus assumed the title "king" and bestowed the same upon his son Demetrius. In 305 BC, he endeavoured to punish the Rhodians for having deserted his cause; his ingenuity in devising new siege engines in his (ultimately unsuccessful) attempt to reduce the capital gained him the title of Poliorcetes. Among his creations were a battering ram 180 feet (55 m) long, requiring 1000 men to operate it; and a wheeled siege tower named "Helepolis" (or "Taker of Cities") which stood 125 feet (38 m) tall and 60 feet (18 m) wide, weighing 360,000 pounds (160,000 kg). After Demetrius failed to conquer Rhodes, the weapons were abandoned, and their bronze was used by the Rhodians to construct the Colossus of Rhodes.

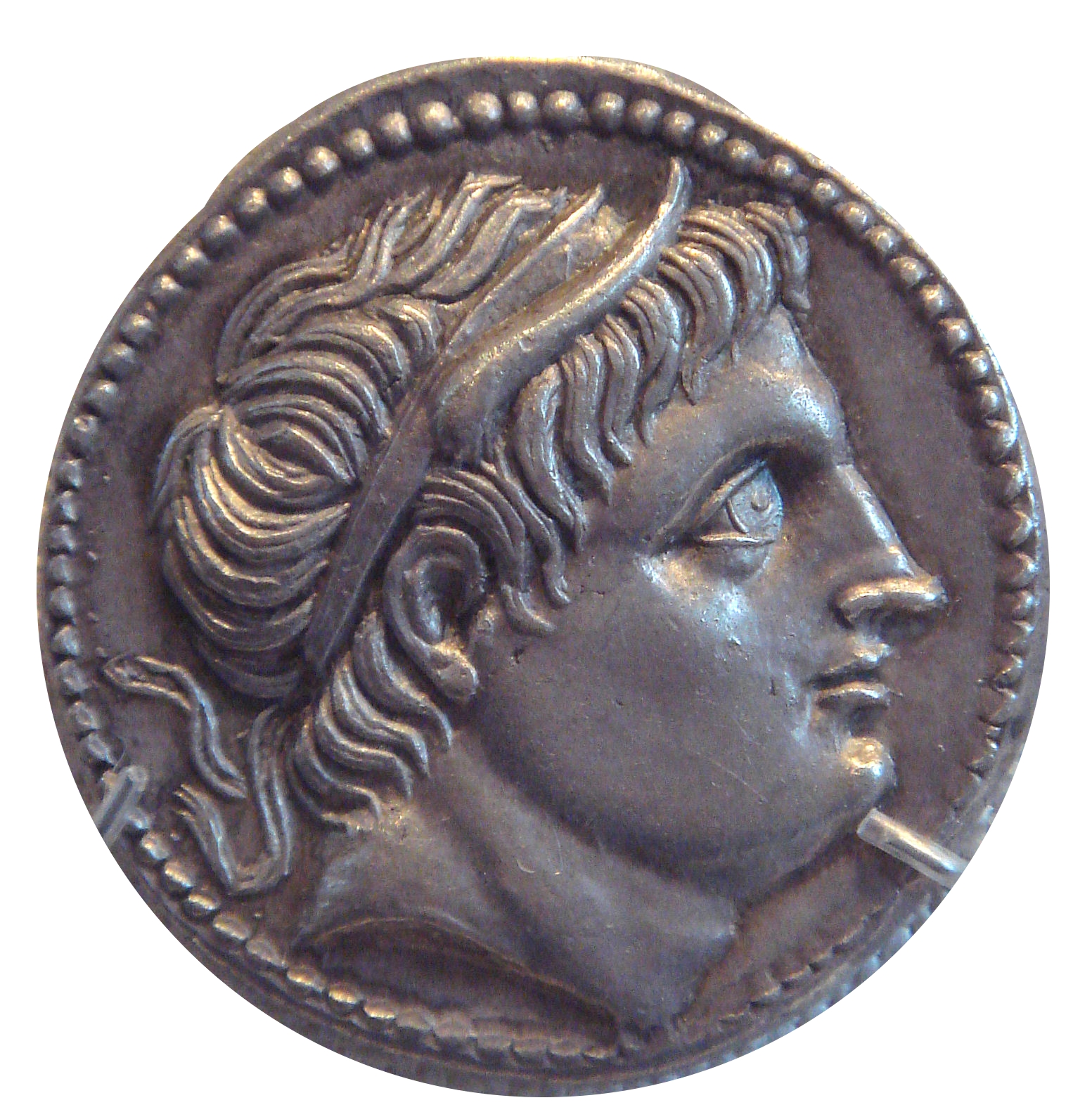
Demetrius I Poliorcetes portrayed on a tetradrachm coin

In 304 BC, he returned a second time to Greece as liberator, and reinstated the Corinthian League, but his licentiousness and extravagance made the Athenians long for the government of Cassander. Among his outrages was his courtship of a young boy named Democles the Handsome. The youth kept on refusing his attention but one day found himself cornered at the baths. Having no way out and being unable to physically resist his suitor, he took the lid off the hot water cauldron and jumped in. His death was seen as a mark of honor for himself and his country. In another instance, Demetrius waived a fine of 50 talents imposed on a citizen in exchange for the favors of Cleaenetus, that man's son. He also sought the attention of Lamia, a Greek courtesan. He demanded 250 talents from the Athenians, which he then gave to Lamia and other courtesans to buy soap and cosmetics.

He also roused the jealousy of Alexander's Diadochi; Seleucus, Cassander and Lysimachus united to destroy him and his father. The hostile armies met at the Battle of Ipsus in Phrygia (301 BC). Antigonus was killed, and Demetrius, after sustaining severe losses, retired to Ephesus. This reversal of fortune stirred up many enemies against him—the Athenians refused even to admit him into their city. But he soon afterwards ravaged the territory of Lysimachus and effected a reconciliation with Seleucus, to whom he gave his daughter Stratonice in marriage. Athens was at this time oppressed by the tyranny of Lachares—a popular leader who made himself supreme in Athens in 296 BC—but Demetrius, after a protracted blockade, gained possession of the city (294 BC) and pardoned the inhabitants for their misconduct in 301 BC in a great display of mercy, a trait Demetrius highly valued in a ruler.

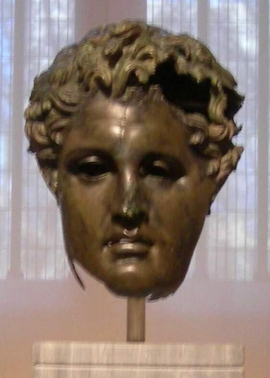
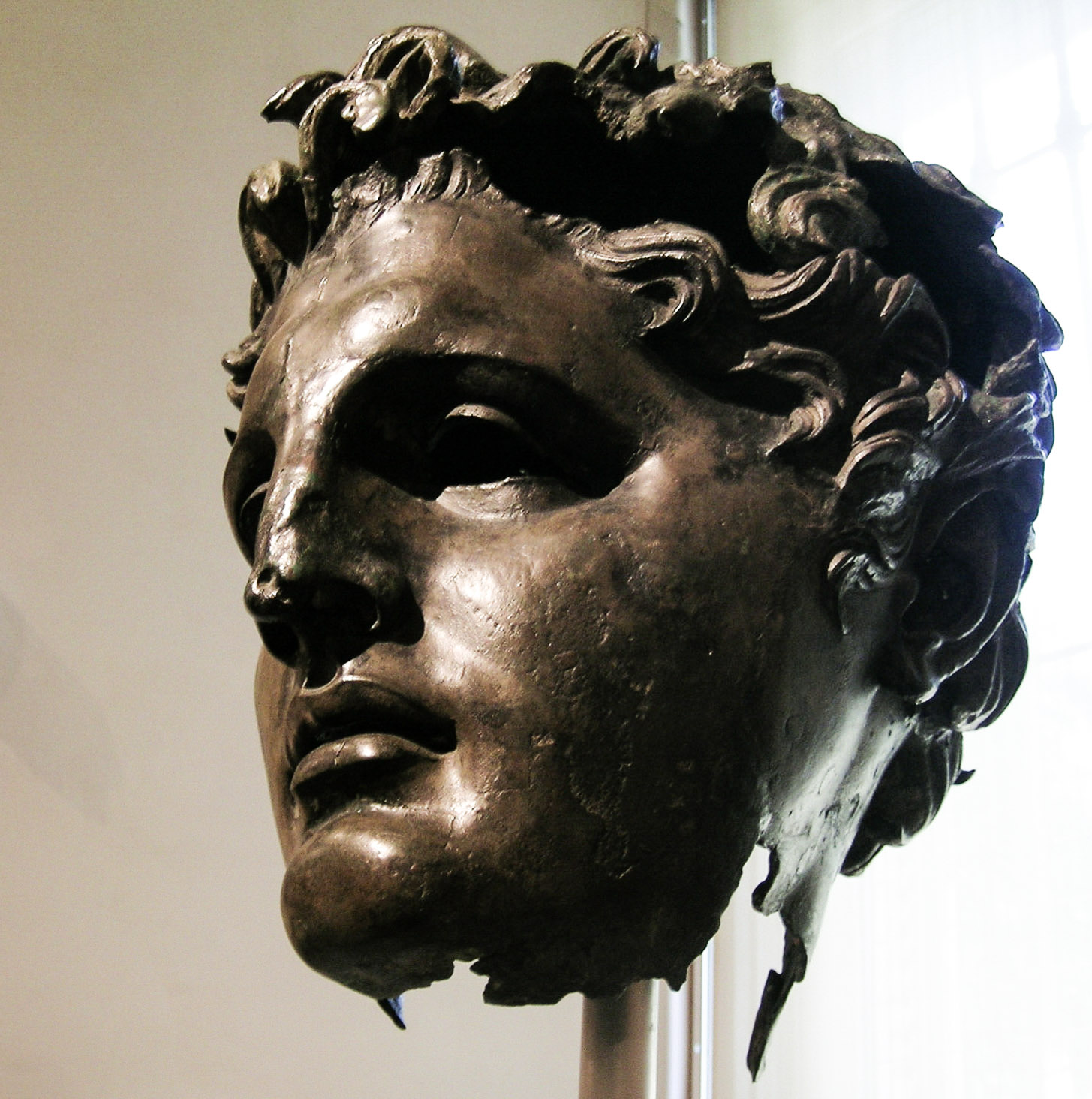
Bronze portrait head, as of September 2007 housed in the Prado Museum, Madrid. This head is no longer identified as Hephaestion, and instead may be Demetrius.

After Athens' capitulation, Demetrius formed a new government which espoused a major dislocation of traditional democratic forms, which anti Macedonian democrats would have called oligarchy. The cyclical rotation of the secretaries of the Council and the election of archons by allotment, were both abolished. In 294/3 - 293/2 BC, two of the most prominent men in Athens were designated by the Macedonian king, Olympiordoros and Phillipides of Paiania. Their appointment by the King is implied by Plutarch who says that "he established the archons which were most acceptable to the Demos."

=== King of Macedonia ===
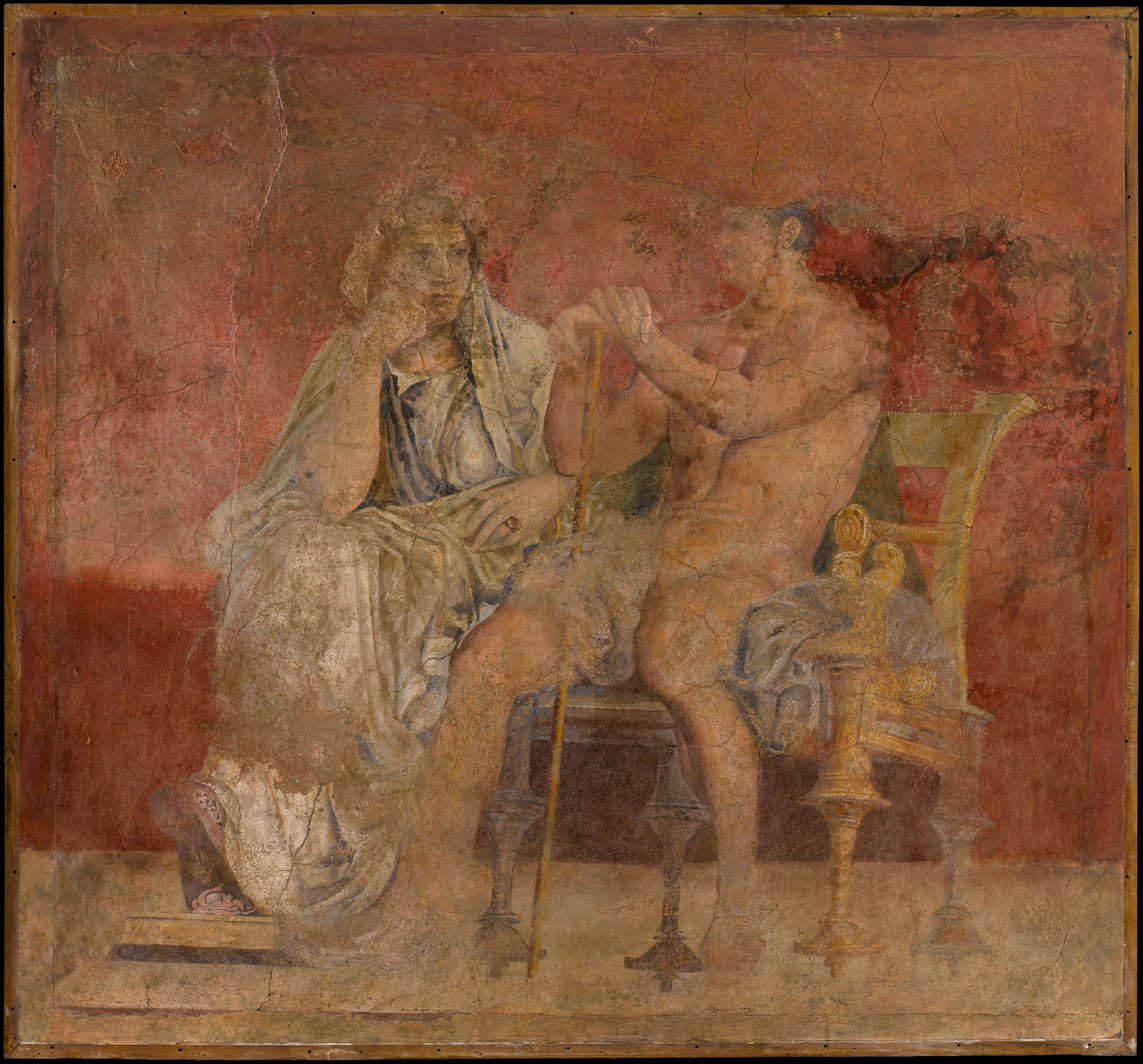
A fresco in Pompeii possibly depicting Lanassa and Demetrius I, ca. 50–40 BC.

In 294 BC, he established himself on the throne of Macedonia by murdering Alexander V, the son of Cassander. He faced rebellion from the Boeotians but secured the region after capturing Thebes in 291 BC. That year he married Lanassa, the former wife of Pyrrhus, but his new position as ruler of Macedonia was continually threatened by Pyrrhus, who took advantage of his occasional absence to ravage the defenceless part of his kingdom (Plutarch, Pyrrhus, 7 ff.); at length, the combined forces of Pyrrhus, Ptolemy and Lysimachus, assisted by the disaffected among his own subjects, obliged him to leave Macedonia in 288 BC.

After besieging Athens without success he passed into Asia and attacked some of the provinces of Lysimachus with varying success. Famine and pestilence destroyed the greater part of his army, and he solicited Seleucus' support and assistance. However, before he reached Syria hostilities broke out, and after he had gained some advantages over his son-in-law, Demetrius was totally forsaken by his troops on the field of battle and surrendered to Seleucus.

His son Antigonus offered all his possessions, and even his own person, in order to procure his father's liberty, but all proved unavailing, and Demetrius died after a confinement of three years (283 BC). His remains were given to Antigonus and honoured with a splendid funeral at Corinth. His descendants remained in possession of the Macedonian throne until the time of Perseus, when Macedon was conquered by the Romans in 168 BC.

== Legacy ==
=== Military legacy ===
==== Besieger and logistician ====
During his 30-year military career, from the Battle of Paraitakene in 317 BC to his final defeat, Demetrius proved to be a hugely effective commander during sieges. Notably, he managed to use the innovations introduced by Alexander, scaling them up to greater extents. Thus, besides the massive and widespread use of siege engines, which he standardized in Hellenistic warfare, Demetrius was an excellent logistician, able to maintain sieges on unprecedented scales. The Antigonid also engaged in amphibious siege warfare, frequently conducting sieges both by sea and land. Finally, despite some failed sieges, especially the siege of Rhodes where Demetrius did not appear to make significant tactical or strategic errors, he employed a siege warfare strategy sometimes described as 'blitzkrieg'. During his campaigns in 304-303 BC and 294-291 BC in Greece, after rapid 'bursts', he captured cities one after another in a matter of months; for example, in 304-303 BC, he successively seized Panactum, Phyle, Kechries, Epidaurus, Sicyon, Corinth, Bura, Scirus (Arcadia), Argos, and Orchomenus. According to Plutarch, Demetrius would have commanded 110,000 soldiers under his leadership in 288 BCE before facing complete defeat. This figure is almost certainly exaggerated by the ancient author and would represent the largest concentration of manpower in the entire Hellenistic period, more than two times larger than the force Alexander led in his initial conquests. Even if the figure is overstated, it demonstrates that Demetrius was capable of assembling significant armies, some of which were remembered as the largest of the era.

==== Military engineer and builder ====
Demetrius also emerged as an important military engineer and fortifier of cities. Firstly, he established effective strategies and developed new siege engines to address specific challenges during certain sieges or to experiment with new methods of siege warfare. In addition to his interest in military engineering, Demetrius distinguished himself by constructing and erecting numerous fortifications, significantly influencing this discipline and leaving his mark on the history of the Greek world.

For instance, in 307-306 BC, after his first capture of Athens, he undertook one of the most significant fortification projects in the city's history. In 303 BC, after capturing Sicyon and noticing the weaknesses in its defenses, he decided to completely relocate the city to a more defensible position and, according to Plutarch, personally worked on the construction of the new city.

Corinth also appears to have undergone substantial fortification work initiated by Demetrius after he conquered the city, as suggested by archaeological discoveries related to the urbanization of the city at that time. These elements also highlight his impact on the history of defensive siege warfare and paint the picture of a builder king.

=== Literary references ===
==== Plutarch ====
Plutarch wrote a biography of Demetrius, in which he is paired with Mark Antony.

==== Hegel ====
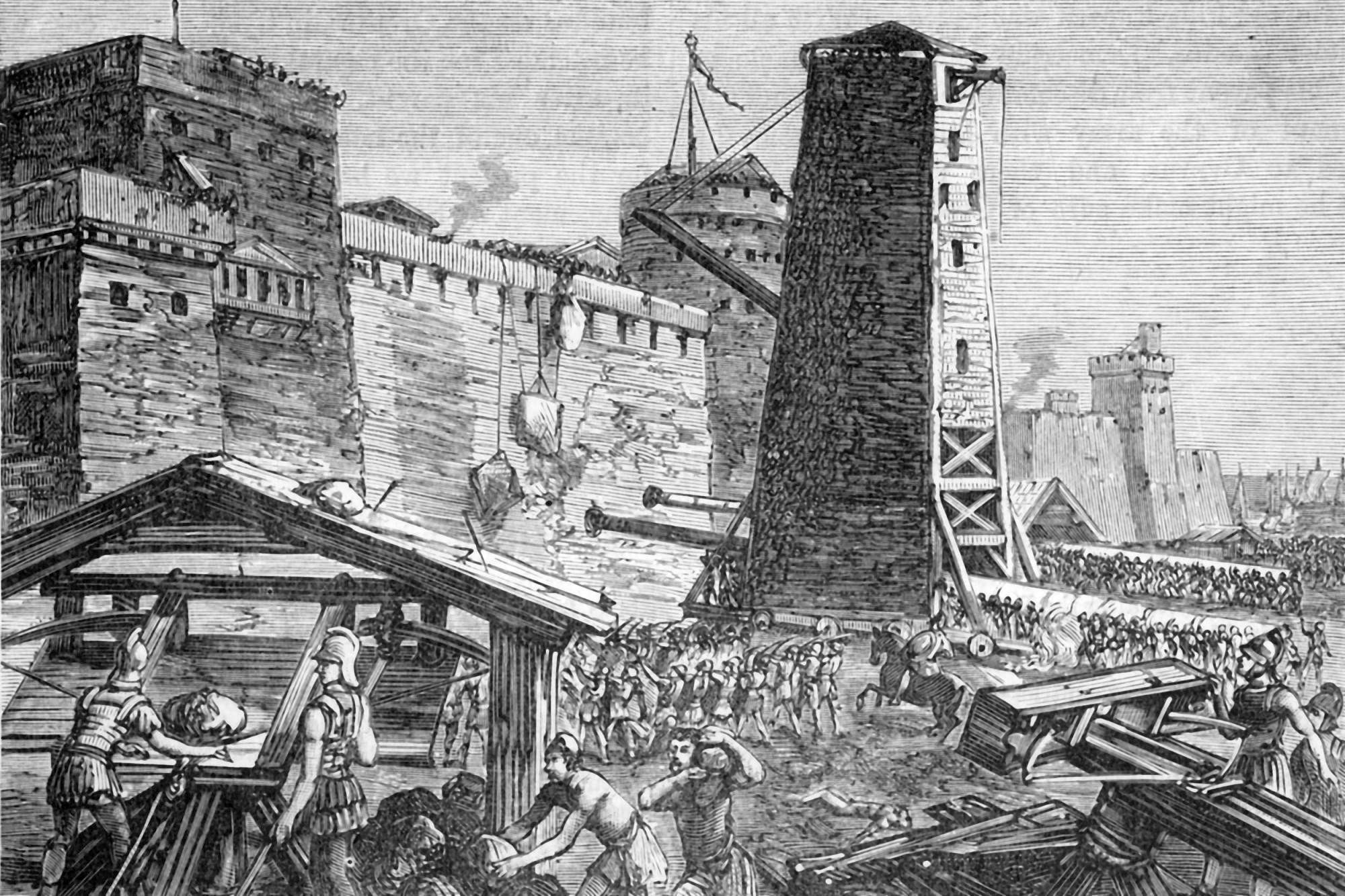
The Siege of Rhodes (305-304 BC), led by Demetrius.

Hegel, in the Lectures on the History of Philosophy, says of another Demetrius, Demetrius Phalereus, that "Demetrius Phalereus and others were thus soon after [Alexander] honoured and worshipped in Athens as God." What the exact source was for Hegel's claim is unclear. Diogenes Laërtius in his short biography of Demetrius Phalereus does not mention this. Apparently Hegel's error comes from a misreading of Plutarch's Life of Demetrius which is about Demetrius Poliorcetes and not Demetrius of Phalereus. Plutarch describes in the work how Demetrius Poliorcetes conquered Demetrius Phalereus at Athens. Then, in chapter 12 of the work, Plutarch describes how Demetrius Poliorcetes was given honors due to the god Dionysus. This account by Plutarch was confusing not only for Hegel, but for others as well.

==== Others ====
Plutarch's account of Demetrius's departure from Macedonia in 288 BC inspired Constantine Cavafy to write "King Demetrius" (ὁ βασιλεὺς Δημήτριος) in 1906, his earliest surviving poem on an historical theme.

Demetrius is the main character of the opera Demetrio a Rodi (Turin, 1789) with libretto by Giandomenico Boggio and Giuseppe Banti. The music is set by Gaetano Pugnani (1731-1798).

Demetrius appears (under the Greek form of his name, Demetrios) in L. Sprague de Camp's historical novel, The Bronze God of Rhodes, which largely concerns itself with his siege of Rhodes.

Alfred Duggan's novel Elephants and Castles provides a lively fictionalised account of his life.

== Family ==
Demetrius was married five times:

- His first wife was Phila daughter of Regent Antipater by whom he had two children: Stratonice of Syria and Antigonus II Gonatas.
- His second wife was Eurydice of Athens, by whom he is said to have had a son called Corrhabus.
- His third wife was Deidamia, a sister of Pyrrhus of Epirus. Deidamia bore him a son called Alexander, who is said by Plutarch to have spent his life in Egypt, probably in an honourable captivity.
- His fourth wife was Lanassa, the former wife of his brother-in-law Pyrrhus of Epirus.
- His fifth wife was Ptolemais, daughter of Ptolemy I Soter and Eurydice of Egypt, by whom he had a son called Demetrius the Fair.

He also had a relationship with a celebrated courtesan called Lamia of Athens, by whom he had a daughter called Phila.

== See also ==
- Winged Victory of Samothrace
- List of sieges conducted by Demetrius I Poliorcetes
- Campaign of the Chersonese

== Sources ==
=== Ancient sources ===
- Plutarch, Life of Demetrius
- Diodorus Siculus, Library of History, books 19–21
- Polyaenus, Stratagems, 4.7
- Justin, Epitome of Trogus, books 15–16
- Athenaeus, Deipnosophists, 6.252–255

=== Modern works ===
- Pat Wheatley, Charlotte Dunn : Demetrius the Besieger. Oxford University Press, Oxford 2020, ISBN 978-0-19-883604-9.
- R. M. Errington, A History of the Hellenistic World, pp. 33–58. Blackwell Publishing (2008). ISBN 978-0-631-23388-6.
- Demetrius I at Livius.org
- Billows, Richard A. (1990). Antigonos the One-Eyed and the Creation of the Hellenistic State. Berkeley and Los Angeles, California: University of California Press. ISBN 0-520-20880-3.
- Sidnell, Phil (2007). Warhorse: Cavalry in Ancient Warfare. Bloomsbury Publishing. ISBN 9780826421050.

Regnal titles
Preceded by Antigonus I Monophthalmus	Antigonid dynasty	Succeeded by Antigonus II Gonatas
Preceded by Antipater II of Macedon	King of Macedon; 294–288 BC	Succeeded by Lysimachus and Pyrrhus of Epirus
