= Babylonian War =

4th century BC conflict

- Part of the Wars of the Diadochi
| Date | 311–309 BC |
| Location | Babylonia, Media, and Elam |
| Result | Seleucid victory |
| Territorial changes | Seleucid control of Babylonia, Media, and Elam |

Belligerents
| Antigonids | Seleucids |

Commanders and leaders
| Antigonos; Demetrios | Seleukos |

The Babylonian War was a conflict fought between 311–309 BC between Antigonus I Monophthalmus and Seleucus I Nicator, ending in a victory for Seleucus. This conflict ended any possibility of restoration of the former empire of Alexander the Great, a result confirmed in the Battle of Ipsus. The battle also marked the birth of the Seleucid Empire by giving Seleucus control over the eastern satrapies of Alexander's former territory.

== Preliminaries ==
After the death of Alexander the Great on 11 June 323 BC, his empire disintegrated. Officers who were trying to save it were defeated during the First War of the Diadochi. During the Second War of the Diadochi, the power of Antigonus I Monophthalmus, who had created a state of his own in Anatolia and Syria, was growing; this caused alarm among the other generals, but in the Third War of the Diadochi, Antigonus managed to keep Ptolemy I Soter of Egypt and Cassander of Macedon in check. In December 311 BC, the warring parties concluded the Peace of the Dynasts, and recognized each other. The only ruler who was excluded was Seleucus I Nicator. Antigonus had expelled Seleucus, satrap of Babylonia, in 316 BC, but Ptolemy had given him an army, which he now used to return to his satrapy.

== Campaigns ==
Seleucus, reinforced with Macedonian veterans from Carrhae (Harran), reached his former capital Babylon in the second half of May 311 BC. He was soon recognized as the new ruler. Only the fortress remained occupied by a garrison loyal to Antigonus. Seleucus now built a dam in the Euphrates and created an artificial lake; in August, he suddenly broke the dam, and a flood wave destroyed the walls of the fortress.

Antigonus' satraps in Media and Aria, Nicanor and Euagoras, now decided to intervene with an army of 10,000 infantry and 7,000 horsemen, but Seleucus and an army of 3,000 infantry and 400 cavalry had been waiting for them near the Tigris since September 311 BC. By hiding his men in one of the marshes and attacking by night, Seleucus was able to defeat the Macedonian soldiers in the army of Nicanor and Euagoras, after which the Iranian soldiers decided to side with the ruler of Babylonia (November 311 BC). Without any problems, Seleucus could move through the Zagros Mountains, occupy Ecbatana (the capital of Media), and continue to Susa (the capital of Elam). He now controlled southern Iraq and the greater part of Iran.

News of the defeat of Nicanor and Euagoras must have reached Antigonus at about the time of his signing the Peace of the Dynasts (December 311 BC). He ordered his son Demetrius Poliorcetes to restore order; he arrived in the early spring of 310, when Seleucus was still in the east. Although Demetrius managed to enter Babylon, he was not able to cope with the resistance that Seleucus' adherents were able to organize, and he returned to Syria without having achieved his goal. His father Antigonus tried again in the autumn of 310, and also managed to enter Babylon, but was forced to leave the city in March 309. Returning to the northwest, he met the army of Seleucus, who ordered his soldiers to have their meal during the night, attacked Antigonus' soldiers while they were having breakfast, and won a decisive victory.

== Significance ==
Antigonus retreated and accepted that Babylonia, Media, and Elam belonged to Seleucus. The victor now moved to the east and reached the Indus valley, where he would confront Chandragupta Maurya and have a treaty signed that was mutually beneficial. The Mauryan emperor received the eastern parts of the Seleucid Empire, which included Afghanistan, Pakistan and west India, and gave Seleucus a formidable force of five hundred war elephants in exchange of marrying his daughter to Chandragupta Maurya. By adding all of Iran and Afghanistan, Seleucus became the most powerful ruler since Alexander the Great. Restoration of Alexander's Empire was, after the Babylonian War, no longer possible. This outcome was confirmed in the Fourth War of the Diadochi and the Battle of Ipsus (301 BC).

== Sources ==
Our knowledge is based on Diodorus Siculus, World History, 19.90-93 and 19.100. He discusses Seleucus' battle against the satraps and Demetrius and offers plausible numbers for the armies, but ignores the campaign of Antigonus. This is described in one of the contemporary Babylonian Chronicles, the Chronicle of the Diadochi (= ABC 10 = BCHP 3), which also offers the chronological framework. Since the publication of this cuneiform tablet, now in the British Museum, our understanding of this conflict has much increased. However, the historical accuracy of the Seleucus victory over Antigonus is largely questionable.

== Literature ==
- T. Boiy, Between High and Low. A Chronology of the Early Hellenistic Period (2007).
- I. Finkel & R.J. van der Spek, Babylonian Chronicles of the Hellenistisc Period (= BCHP; forthcoming)
- A.K. Grayson, Assyrian and Babylonian Chronicles (= ABC; 1975, 1977)
- Pat Wheatley, "Antigonus Monophthalmus in Babylonia, 310-308 B.C." in: Journal of Near Eastern Studies 61 (2002), 39-47.
- Richard A. Billows, Antigonos the One-Eyed and the Creation of the Hellenistic State (1990).
