= Siege of Athens (287 BC) =

Siege in 287 BCE

Coordinates: 37.967427°N 23.721183°E

Date	287 BC
Location	Athens
Result	Athenian and Epirote victory

Belligerents
Macedonia	Athens; Epirus

Commanders and leaders
Demetrios I	Olympiodoros; Pyrrhos I

The siege of Athens lasted through 287 BC when the city was put under siege by King Demetrius I of Macedon. Athens revolted in that year against Demetrius' rule and elected Olympiodorus as strategos. Olympiodorus raised a force among the Athenian citizens, including old men and children, and attacked the Macedonian garrison that had retreated to the fort at the Mouseion Hill which he took with the loss of just 13 of his men.

On receiving news of the revolt Demetrius gathered forces from the cities he still held and put Athens under siege. The Athenians sent the philosopher Crates to negotiate with Demetrius. In the treaty signed Demetrius received some fortresses in Attica but Athens was freed from a Macedonian garrison. The Athenians resisted, but asked for help from Pyrrhus, king of Epirus. Pyrrhus arrived with his army behind Demetrius, forcing him to retreat. Following the victory, Pyrrhus was welcomed into the city and celebrated.
