= Siege of Thebes (292–291 BC) =

Battle in 291 BC

Date	292–291 BC
Location	Thebes, Boeotia 38°19′27″N 23°19′25″E
Result	Macedonian victory

Belligerents
Macedonia	Thebes

Commanders and leaders
Demetrios I (WIA); Antigonos	Peisis
- Location within Greece Southern Siege of Thebes (292–291 BC) (Greece)

The siege of Thebes lasted from 292 until 291 BC. The city was put under siege by King Demetrius I of Macedon after it had revolted against Macedonian rule.

== History ==
In 293, the Boeotians had revolted against Demetrius' rule but the revolt was quickly put down. In 292, the region revolted again, led by the same man, Peisis of Thespiae, whom Demetrius had pardoned the previous year.

Demetrius besieged the city, but left for Thrace when he heard the news that Lysimachus had been taken prisoner by the Getae, hoping to rip the spoils from his undefended kingdom. Antigonus commanded the siege in his father's absence. Demetrius returned after Lysimachus was released from captivity. Although he had brought his siege engines, including his famous Helepolis, "Taker of Cities", the siege went slowly, and fierce Theban resistance blocked his troops.

The Thebans defended their city stubbornly. Demetrius often forced his men to attack the city at great cost, even though there was little hope of capturing it. It is said that, distressed by the heavy losses, Antigonus asked his father: "Why, father, do we allow these lives to be thrown away so unnecessarily?" Demetrius appears to have shown his contempt for the lives of his soldiers by replying: "We don't have to find rations for the dead." But he also showed a similar disregard for his own life and was badly wounded at the siege by a bolt through the neck.

The city finally fell in 291 BC or even 290 BC. Demetrius showed leniency and only executed a few leaders of the rebellion.
