= Antigonus I Monophthalmus =

Macedonian general, founder of Antigonid dynasty (382–301 BC)

- Basileus
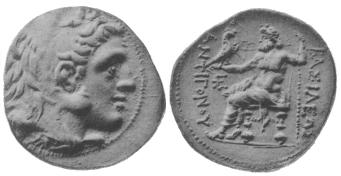
- Coin of Antigonus, the Greek inscription reads "ΒΑΣΙΛΕΩΣ ΑΝΤΙΓΟΝΟΥ" meaning [coin] of King Antigonus

Basileus of the Antigonid Empire
- Reign: 306–301 BC
- Coronation: 306 BC, Antigoneia
- Predecessor: Alexander IV
- Successor: Demetrius I
- Born: 382 BC; Macedonia
- Died: 301 BC (aged 80–81); Ipsus, Phrygia (modern-day Çayırbağ, Afyonkarahisar, Turkey)
- Consort: Stratonice
- Issue: Demetrius I; Philip
- Dynasty: Antigonid dynasty
- Father: Philip
- Military career
- Conflicts: Wars of Philip II of Macedon; Wars of Alexander the Great; Wars of the Diadochi; First War of the Diadochi; Battle of Orkynia; Battle of Cretopolis; Second War of the Diadochi; Battle of Byzantium; Battle of Paraitakene; Battle of Gabiene; Babylonian War; Third siege of Babylon; Battle of the 25 of Abu; Fourth War of the Diadochi; Battle of Ipsus †

Antigonus I Monophthalmus (Ancient Greek: Ἀντίγονος Μονόφθαλμος Antigonos Monophthalmos, "Antigonus the One-Eyed"; 382–301 BC) was a Macedonian Greek general and successor of Alexander the Great who founded the Antigonid dynasty, which ruled over Macedonia until its conquest by the Roman Republic in 168 BC. A prominent military leader in Alexander's army, he went on to control large parts of Alexander's former empire. He assumed the title of basileus (king) in 306 BC and reigned until his death.

Antigonus likely served under Philip II of Macedon. He took part in Alexander's invasion of Achaemenid Persia and was named satrap of Phrygia. After Alexander's death in 323 BC, he also received Pamphylia and Lycia in accordance with the Partition of Babylon. However, he later incurred the enmity of Perdiccas, the regent of Alexander's empire, and was driven from Phrygia. He fled to Greece and formed an alliance with Antipater, later joined by Ptolemy, against Perdiccas. Perdiccas was murdered by his own officers in 320 BC, and Antipater was elected the new regent.

During a series of wars between Alexander's successors, Antigonus briefly emerged as the most powerful of the Diadochi, ruling over Greece, Asia Minor, Syria, Phoenicia and northern Mesopotamia. Cassander, Seleucus, Ptolemy and Lysimachus formed a coalition against him, which culminated in his decisive defeat and death at the Battle of Ipsus in 301 BC. His kingdom was divided up by Lysimachus and Seleucus, but his son Demetrius survived and went on to seize control of Macedonia in 294 BC.

== Early career ==
Antigonus was born in Macedonia around 382 BC to a nobleman named Philip and his wife, whose name is unknown. While some sources claim that Antigonus "came from peasant or yeoman stock, [and] others that his family was linked to the Macedonian royal house [...] both seem unlikely. [...] [I]n all probability the family was socially prominent and from the Macedonian nobility." Not much is known about Antigonus's early career. He must have been an important figure in the Macedonian Army, as by the time he emerges in historical sources he is noted as being in command of a large part of Alexander's army, with responsibility over approximately 7,000 allied Greek infantry. There is an anecdote recorded by Plutarch about an Antigonus who lost an eye at the Siege of Perinthus in 340 BC after "a catapult bolt struck him in the eye". According to historian Richard Billows, this story "fits Antigonos better than we know it to fit anyone else." Since Antigonus was of the same age as Philip, and a nobleman, he almost certainly served in Philip's campaigns, possibly under Philip's brothers, (Alexander II and Perdiccas III). His importance at Philip's court is shown by the friendships he established with Antipater and Eumenes, two of Philip's chief lieutenants.

== Satrap of Phrygia ==
In 334 BC, Antigonus served as the commander of the allied Greek infantry, a division of Alexander's invasion army of the Persian Empire. Alexander did not trust his Greek infantry and had left them behind when he marched to confront the Western Satraps; therefore Antigonus did not participate in the Battle of the Granicus. When Alexander marched east, he appointed Antigonus as satrap of Phrygia. As Satrap of Phrygia, Antigonus besieged a garrison of mercenaries (1,000 Carians and 100 Greeks) the Persians had left behind and after their surrender he enrolled them in his service allowing him to send his own Greek troops (1,500 mercenaries) to reinforce Alexander for the major battle that was about to be fought at Issus. After the Battle of Issus, he succeeded the Achaemenid satrap of Greater Phrygia, Atizyes, who had died during the battle. Antigonus successfully performed his primary responsibility: to defend Alexander's lines of supply and communication during the latter's extended campaign against the Achaemenid Persian Empire. Following Alexander's victory at Issus, part of the Persian army regrouped in Cappadocia and attempted to sever Alexander's lines of supply and communication running through the centre of Asia Minor; however, Antigonus defeated the Persian forces in three separate battles. After defeating the Persian counter-attack, Antigonus focused on conquering the rest of Phrygia and maintaining Alexander's lines of communication and supply.

== Alexander's death ==
At the division of the provinces (the so-called Partition of Babylon) after Alexander's death in 323 BC, Antigonus held authority over Phrygia, Lycaonia, Pamphylia, Lycia and western Pisidia confirmed by Perdiccas, the regent of the empire. However, he incurred the enmity of Perdiccas by refusing to assist Eumenes to obtain possession of the provinces allotted to him: Paphlagonia and Cappadocia. Leonnatus had left with his army for Greece, leaving Antigonus alone to deal with Cappadocia, a task he apparently could not or would not complete without additional aid. Perdiccas seems to have viewed this as a direct affront to his authority, and led the royal army to conquer the area. From there, Perdiccas turned west towards Phrygia as a provocation toward Antigonus, who escaped with his son Demetrius to Greece, where he obtained the favor of Antipater, the viceroy of Macedonia (321 BC), and Craterus, one of Alexander's top generals. During the First War of the Diadochi, he formed a coalition with Antipater, Craterus and Ptolemy. In 320 BC, Antigonus sailed to and secured Cyprus. The war ended in 320 BC, when Perdiccas was murdered by discontented officers (Seleucus and Antigenes) while unsuccessfully trying to invade Ptolemy's satrapy of Egypt.

== Death of Perdiccas ==
With the death of Perdiccas in 321 BC, a new attempt at dividing the empire took place at Triparadisus. Antipater was made the new regent of the empire and Antigonus became Strategos of Asia. Antigonus was entrusted with the command of the war against the former members of the Perdiccan faction who had been condemned at Triparadisus.

Antigonus took charge of a part of the Royal Army, and after being reinforced with more reliable troops from Antipater's European army, he marched against the ex-Perdiccans Eumenes, Alketas, Domikos, Attalos and Polemon in Asia Minor. Antigonus decided to first deal with Eumenes, who was in Cappadocia. Despite being outnumbered, Antigonus adopted a bold aggressive strategy. He eventually out-generaled and defeated Eumenes at the Battle of Orkynia, forcing him to retire to the fortress of Nora (Greek: Νῶρα). Leaving Eumenes under siege, Antigonus now marched on the combined forces of Alcetas, Dokimos, Attalos and Polemon near Cretopolis in Pisidia. Antigonus surprised and defeated his opponents at the Battle of Cretopolis. Antigonus, in two brilliant campaigns in the course of one campaigning season, had annihilated the remnants of the Perdiccan faction with the exception of Eumenes, who was bottled up in Nora.

== Antipater's death and the Second Diadochi War ==
When Antipater died in 319 BC, he left the regentship to Polyperchon, excluding Cassander, his son. Antigonus and the other dynasts refused to recognize Polyperchon, since it would have undermined their own ambitions. Antigonus entered into negotiations with Eumenes, but Eumenes had already been swayed by Polyperchon, who gave him authority over all other generals within the empire. Affecting his escape from Nora through trickery, Eumenes raised a small army and fled south into Cilicia. Antigonus did not move against Eumenes directly because he was tied up in northwestern Asia Minor campaigning against Cleitus the White who had a large fleet at the Hellespont.

Cleitus was able to defeat Antigonus's admiral Nicanor in a sea battle but he was caught off guard the next morning when Antigonus and Nicanor launched a double assault by land and sea on his camp, Cleitus was taken completely by surprise and his entire force was captured or killed (see: Battle of Byzantium). Meanwhile, Eumenes had taken control of Cilicia, Syria and Phoenicia, formed an alliance with Antigenes and Teutamos, the commanders of the Silver Shields and the Hypaspists, and begun to raise a naval force on behalf of Polyperchon. When it was ready he sent the fleet west to reinforce Polyperchon, but off the coast of Cilicia it was met by Antigonus's fleet and changed sides. Antigonus had settled his affairs in Asia Minor and marched east into Cilicia, intent on doing battle with Eumenes in Syria. Eumenes somehow had advance knowledge of this and marched out of Phoenicia, through Syria into Mesopotamia, with the idea of gathering support in the upper satrapies.

Eumenes gained the support of Amphimachos, the satrap of Mesopotamia, then marched his army into Northern Babylonia, where he put them into winter quarters. During the winter he negotiated with Seleucus, the satrap of Babylonia, and Peithon, the satrap of Media, seeking their help against Antigonus. Antigonus, finding out Eumenes had left his provinces, took some time securing Cilicia and northern Syria before he marched into Mesopotamia. Unable to sway Seleucus and Pheiton, Eumenes had left his winter quarters early and marched on Susa, a major royal treasury, in Susiana. In Susa, Eumenes sent letters to all the satraps to the north and east of Susiana, ordering them in the kings' names to join him with all their forces. When the satraps joined Eumenes he had a considerable force, with which he could look forward with some confidence to doing battle against Antigonus. Eumenes then marched southeastwards into Persia, where he picked up additional reinforcements Antigonus, meanwhile, had reached Susa and left Seleucus there to besiege the place, while he himself marched after Eumenes. At the river Kopratas, Eumenes surprised Antigonus during the crossing of the river and killed or captured 4,000 of his men. Antigonus, faced with disaster, decided to abandon the crossing and turned back northward, marching up into Media, threatening the upper satrapies. Eumenes wanted to march westward, and cut Antigonus's lines of supply, but the satraps refused to abandon their satrapies and forced Eumenes to stay in the east. In the late summer of 316 BC, Antigonus moved southward again in the hope of bringing Eumenes to battle and ending the war quickly. Eventually the two armies in southern Media and fought in the indecisive Battle of Paraitakene. Antigonus, whose casualties were more numerous, force marched his army to safety the next night. During the winter of 316–315 BC, Antigonus tried to surprise Eumenes in Persia by marching his army across a desert and catching his enemy off guard, unfortunately, he was observed by some locals who reported it to his opponents. A few days later both armies drew up for battle. The Battle of Gabiene was as indecisive as the previous battle at Parataikene. According to Plutarch and Diodorus, Eumenes had won the battle but lost control of his army's baggage camp thanks to his ally Peucestas' duplicity or incompetence. This loss was especially severe for the Silver Shields; the camp contained loot they had accumulated over 30 years of successful warfare, as well as the soldiers' women and children. Approached by Teutamus, one of their commanders, Antigonus offered to return the baggage train in exchange for custody of Eumenes. The Silver Shields complied, arresting Eumenes and his officers and handing them over. The war was thus at an end. Eumenes was placed under guard while Antigonus held a council to decide his fate. Antigonus, backed up by his son Demetrius, was inclined to spare the prisoner, but the council overruled them and Eumenes was executed.

As a result, Antigonus now was in possession of the empire's Asian territories, his authority stretching from the eastern satrapies to Syria and Asia Minor in the west. He seized the treasuries at Susa and entered Babylon. The governor of Babylon, Seleucus, fled to Ptolemy and entered into a league with him, Lysimachus and Cassander.

== The Third Diadochi War ==
In 314 BC, Antigonus received envoys from the allied dynasts Ptolemy, Cassander and Lysimachus who demanded he cede Cappadocia and Lycia to Cassander, Hellespontine Phrygia to Lysimachus, Phoenicia and Syria to Ptolemy, and Babylonia to Seleucus, and that he should share the treasure he had accumulated. His only answer was to advise the dynasts to be ready for war. Antigonus sent Aristodemus with a 1,000 talents to the Peloponnesus to raise an army there and also to make an alliance with his old enemy Polyperchon, he and Polyperchon were then to make war on Cassander, he sent an army under his nephew Ptolemaeus through Cappadocia to the Hellespont to keep Cassander and Lysimachus from invading Asia Minor, he himself invaded Phoenicia which was under Ptolemy's control, and besieged Tyre. The Siege of Tyre took a year, and after securing Phoenicia he marched his main army into Asia Minor intent on taking out Asander (satrap of Lydia and Caria, and ally to Ptolemy and Cassander), leaving the defence of Syria and Phoenicia to his oldest son Demetrius.

In 312 BC, Antigonus captured Lydia and all of Caria, and drove off Asander, he then sent his nephews Telesphorus and Ptolemaeus against Cassander in Greece. While Antigonus was engaged in the west, Ptolemy took advantage of the situation and invaded from the south. He met Demetrius's forces at the battle of Gaza where Ptolemy won a stunning victory. After the battle, Seleucus, who was fighting for Ptolemy, made his way back to Babylonia, and soon established control over his old satrapy and went on to secure the eastern provinces against Antigonus. Seleucus's conquest led to the Babylonian War, during which Seleucus defeated both Demetrius and Antigonus, and secured control over the eastern provinces. After the Babylonian War, which lasted from 311 BC to 309 BC, a peace was concluded between Antigonus and Seleucus leaving them both to consolidate their power in their respective realms (Antigonus in the West and Seleucus in the East).

In the West, Antigonus had worn down his enemies and forced a peace upon them. By this peace he had attained the zenith of his power. Antigonus's empire and alliance system now comprised Greece, Asia Minor, Syria, Phoenicia and northern Mesopotamia.

== The Fourth Diadochi War ==
The peace agreement was soon violated by Ptolemy and Cassander based on the pretext that Antigonus had placed garrisons in some of the free Greek cities. Ptolemy and Cassander renewed hostilities against Antigonus. Demetrius Poliorcetes, the son of Antigonus, wrested part of Greece from Cassander.

In 306 BC, Philip, Antigonus's youngest son, died a premature death, aged about 26–28. This was a severe blow to Antigonus, who not only lost a son, but also a general who might have been of the greatest value to him in the campaigns to come.

After defeating Ptolemy at the naval Battle of Salamis in 306 BC, Demetrius conquered Cyprus. Following that victory Antigonus assumed the title of king and bestowed the same royal rank upon his son. This was effectively a declaration by Antigonus that he now was independent from the empire. The other dynasts, Cassander, Ptolemy, Lysimachus and Seleucus, soon followed Antigonus's lead and declared themselves kings.

Antigonus now prepared a large army and a formidable fleet, the command of which he gave to Demetrius, and hastened to attack Ptolemy in his own dominions. His invasion of Egypt, however, proved a failure as he was unable to penetrate Ptolemy's defences and was obliged to retire, although he inflicted heavy losses on Ptolemy.

In 305 BC, Demetrius attempted the reduction of Rhodes, which had refused to assist Antigonus against Egypt. The siege of Rhodes lasted a year and ended in 304 BC when Demetrius, meeting with obstinate resistance, was obliged to make a peace treaty upon the terms that the Rhodians would build ships for Antigonus and aid him against any enemy except for Ptolemy. The Rhodians dubbed Ptolemy Soter ("savior") for his aid during the lengthy siege.

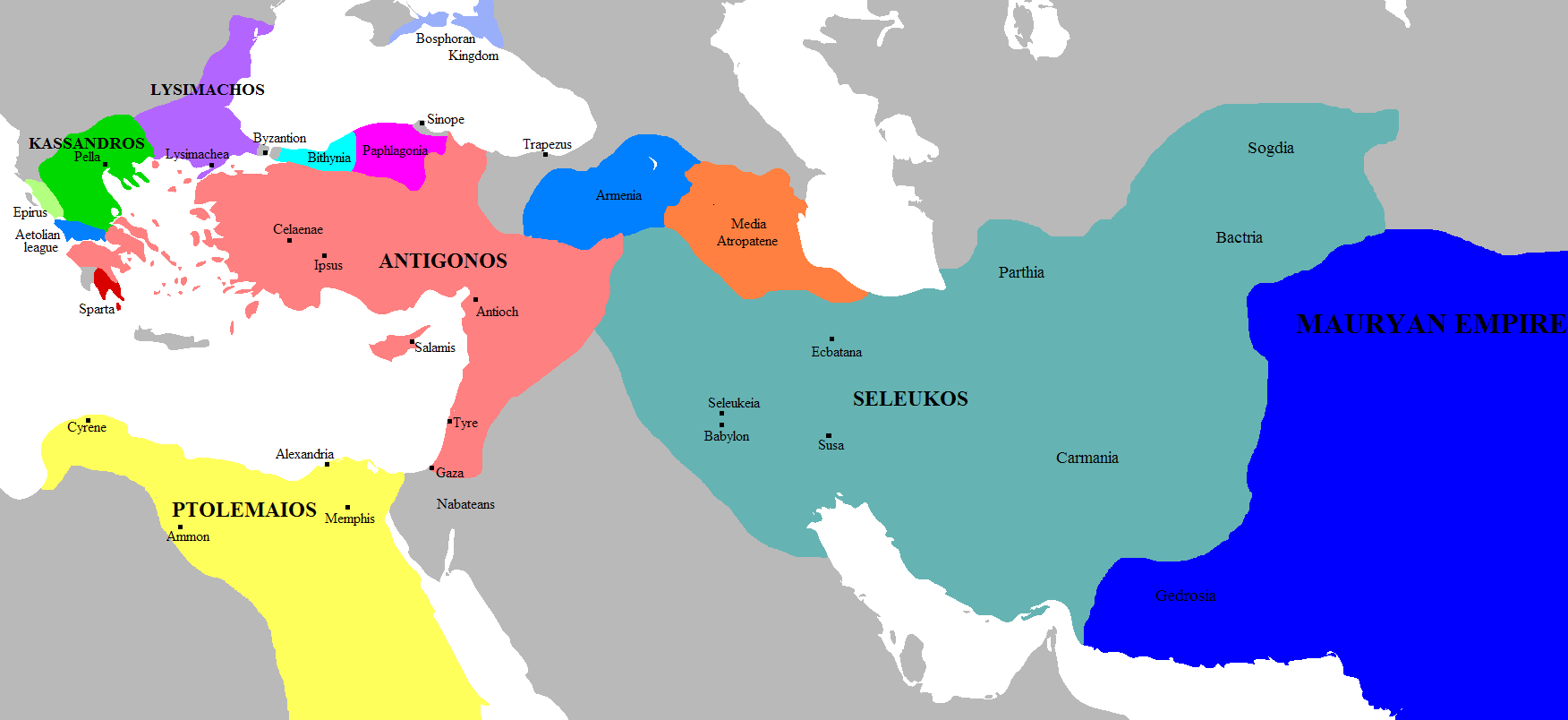
The kingdoms of Antigonus and his rivals circa 303 BC

The most powerful dynasts of the empire, now kings in their own right: Cassander, Seleucus, Ptolemy, and Lysimachus, responded to Antigonus's successes by allying with each other, often through marriage. Antigonus soon found himself at war with all four, largely because his territory shared borders with each of them. In 304–303, Demetrius had Cassander in a difficult position, having gained the support of the Greeks and defeating Cassander repeatedly. Antigonus demanded from Cassander the unconditional submission of Macedonia. Seleucus, Lysimachus, and Ptolemy responded by joining forces and attacking him. Lysimachus and Cassander's general Prepelaos invaded Asia Minor from Thrace, crossing the Hellespont. Lysimachus had soon secured most of the Ionian cities. Meanwhile, Seleucus was marching through Mesopotamia and Cappadocia. Antigonus was obliged to recall Demetrius from Greece, where his son had recently had an indecisive encounter with Cassander in Thessaly. Now Antigonus and Demetrius moved against Lysimachus and Prepelaos.

However, the united forces of Seleucus, Lysimachus, and Prepelaos defeated the army of Antigonus and Demetrius at the decisive Battle of Ipsus in 301 BC. Antigonus died during the battle in his eighty-first year after being struck by a javelin. Prior to Ipsus, he had never lost a battle. With his death, any plans for reuniting Alexander's empire came to an end. Antigonus's kingdom was divided up, with most of his territories ending up in the hands of the new kingdoms ruled by Lysimachus and Seleucus. The victors largely followed Antigonus's precedent and had themselves named as kings, but they did not claim power over the erstwhile empire of Alexander nor over each other. Instead, these kings established a troubled (and in the end failed) modus vivendi with each other, and accepted their kingdoms as separate realms.

Antigonus's surviving son Demetrius took control of Macedonia in 294 BC. Antigonus's descendants held this possession, off and on, until it was conquered by the Roman Republic after the Battle of Pydna in 168 BC.

== Family ==
Antigonus's father was a nobleman named Philip. His mother's name is unknown. Antigonus had an older brother named Demetrius, a younger brother named Ptolemaeus, father of Ptolemaeus. His nephew Telesphorus may have been the son of a third brother. He also had a younger half-brother, Marsyas, from his mother's second marriage to Periander of Pella.

Antigonus married to Stratonice, his older brother's widow and had two sons: Demetrius I Poliorcetes and Philip.

== Physical appearance ==
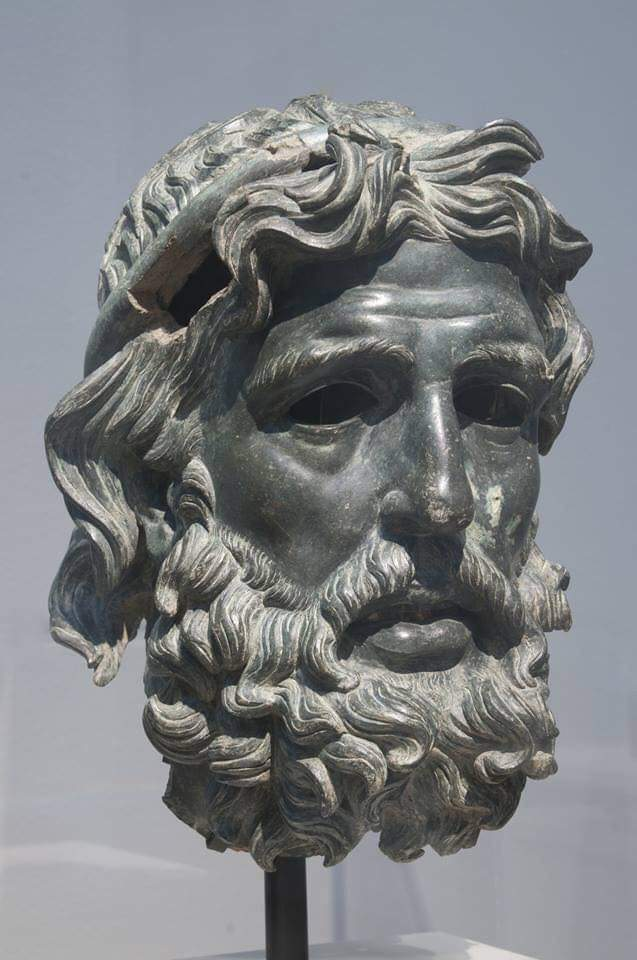
Reputed Bust of Antigonos I the One Eyed.

Antigonus was an exceptionally large man. His son Demetrius is described as being of "heroic stature", meaning no doubt he was a large man, but Antigonus was even taller. Besides this huge physique, he was made even more formidable in appearance because he was missing an eye, having lost it in battle (possibly at the Siege of Perinthus).

== Monophthalmus in historical fiction ==
Mary Renault, in her novel Funeral Games, translates Antigonus's sobriquet into English as "One Eye".

In the 2004 film Alexander, directed by Oliver Stone, Antigonus is played by Ian Beattie.

Antigonus appears (under the Greek form of his name, Antigonos) in L. Sprague de Camp's historical novels An Elephant for Aristotle and The Bronze God of Rhodes, set approximately twenty years apart.

Antigonus figures as the main antagonist in Christian Cameron's historical novel A Force of Kings.

Antigonus appears in the earlier chapters of Alfred Duggan's historical novel Elephants and Castles (U.S. title: Besieger of Cities), based on the life of his son Demetrius.

Antigonous is a supporting antagonist in the Eric Flint alternate history novel The Alexander Inheritance, and its sequel The Macedonian Hazard.

== Sources ==
- Austin, M. M. (1981). The Hellenistic World from Alexander to the Roman Conquest: A Selection of Ancient Sources in Translation. Cambridge: Cambridge University Press.
- The contemporary Babylonian Chronicles, especially the Chronicle of the Diadochi (= ABC 10 = BCHP 3).
- Bar-Kochva, B. (1976). The Seleucid Army. Cambridge: Cambridge University Press.
- Billows, Richard A. (1990). Antigonos the One-Eyed and the Creation of the Hellenistic State. Berkeley and Los Angeles, California: University of California Press. ISBN 0-520-20880-3.
- De Ste. Croix, G. E. M. (1981). The Class Struggle in the Ancient Greek World: From the Archaic Age to the Arab Conquests. Ithaca, NY: Cornell University Press.
- Diodorus Siculus xviii., xx. 46-86
- Gardner, Jane F. (1974). Leadership and the Cult of Personality. London: Dent.
- Gruen, Erich S. (1984). The Hellenistic World and the Coming of Rome. Berkeley: University of California Press.
- Justin xv. 1–4
- Köhler, "Das Reich des Antigonos," in the Sitzungsberichte d. Berl. Akad., 1898, p. 835 f.
- Nepos, Eumenes
- Plutarch, Demetrius, Eumenes
- Simpson, R. H. (1959). "Antigonus the One-Eyed and the Greeks". Historia. 8: 385–409.
- Walbank, R. W. (1981). The Hellenistic World. Cambridge, MA: Harvard University Press.

Antigonus I Monophthalmus Antigonid dynasty Born: 382 BC Died: 301 BC
Regnal titles
Preceded by New creation Independence from Macedon under Alexander IV	Antigonid dynasty 306–301 BC	Succeeded by Demetrius I of Macedon
