= Siege of Rhodes (305–304 BC) =

Military investment by Demetrius Poliorcetes

Coordinates: 36.1667°N 28.0000°E

- Part of the Wars of the Diadochi
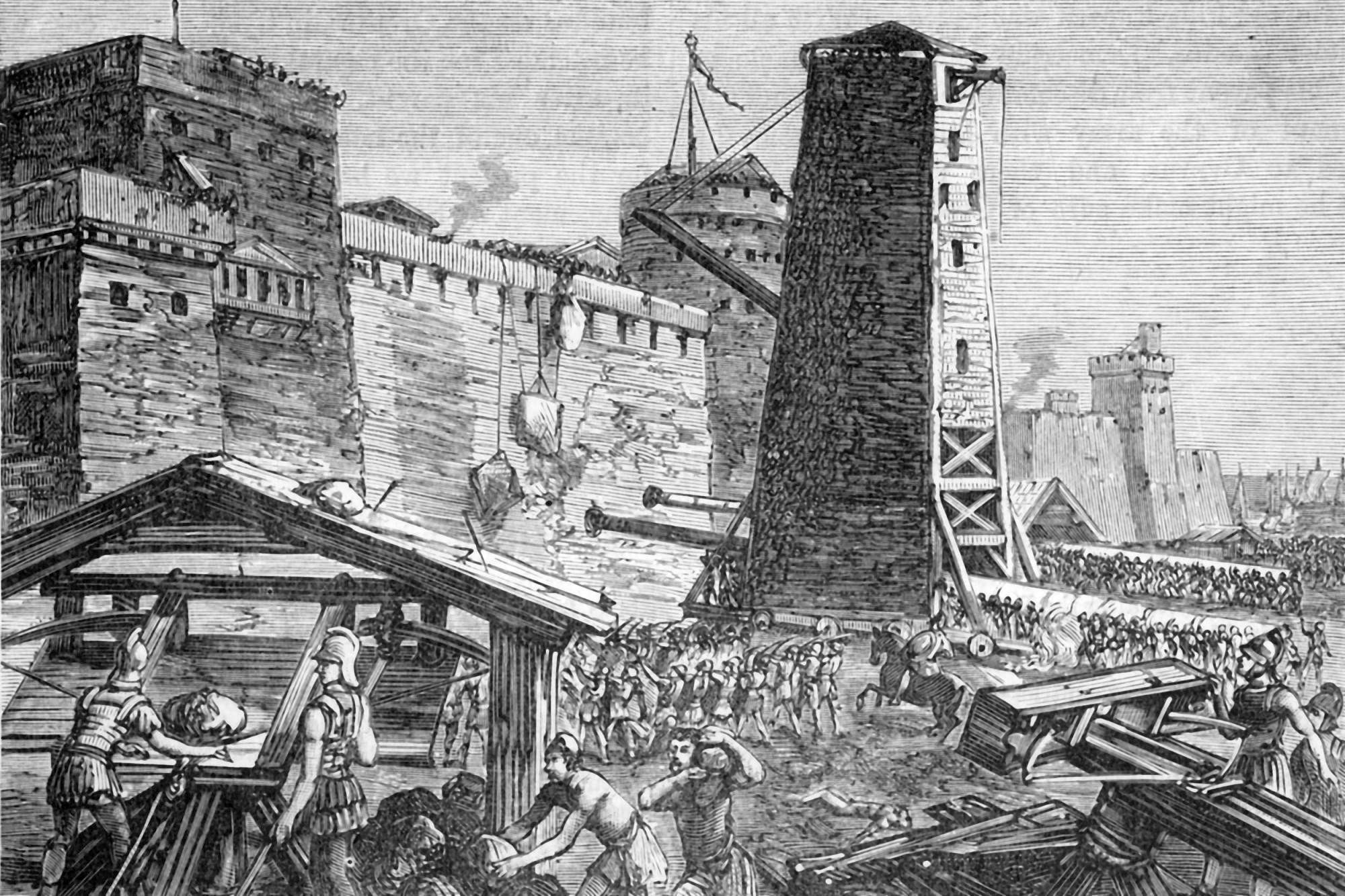
- The siege of Rhodes
Date	305–304 BC
Location	Rhodes island
Result	Rhodian victory; Colossus of Rhodes is erected

Belligerents
Antigonids	Rhodes; Ptolemaic Kingdom

Commanders and leaders
Demetrios I	Ares; Diognetos

Strength
c. 40,000; 170 ships	
- Location of the Siege of Rhodes Siege of Rhodes (305–304 BC) (Greece)

The siege of Rhodes in 305–304 BC was one of the most notable sieges of antiquity, when Demetrius Poliorcetes, son of Antigonus I, besieged Rhodes in an attempt to make it abandon its neutrality and end its close relationship with Ptolemy I.

The attempt ultimately proved unsuccessful, but the scale of the siege, along with the logistical, strategic, and engineering efforts of Demetrius Poliorcetes, cemented his reputation as a military engineer and city conqueror. The significant defence mounted by the Rhodians was also noted by the sources, and thus the siege gradually established itself, within Greek and Roman antiquity, as one of the most notable sieges of their shared past.

To celebrate their victory, the Rhodians erected the Colossus of Rhodes, usually considered one of the Seven Wonders of the Ancient World.

== Background ==
The island of Rhodes was a mercantile republic with a large navy which controlled the entrance to the Aegean Sea. Rhodes maintained treaties of neutrality with other empires to protect trade. However, they had a close relationship with Ptolemy I, and Demetrius was worried Rhodes would supply him with ships. Demetrius also saw the possibility of Rhodes being used as a base of operations. The decision to lay siege to Rhodes was influenced by these fears but it was also effectively a piratical enterprise by Demetrius. Much of the Greek world, regardless of whether they were allies of Demetrius or not, apparently also viewed the siege as a pirate attack and sympathized with the Rhodians, and this attitude existed even in Macedonia.

Demetrius brought an army of roughly 40,000 men, whilst the Rhodians had a force of 6,000 citizens, 1000 metics and aliens, and an unspecified number of slaves, whom the Rhodians promised to buy and free from their masters if they proved themselves in battle.

Along with a fighting fleet of 200 ships and 150 auxiliary vessels, Demetrius also enlisted the aid of many pirate fleets. Over 1,000 private trading vessels followed his fleets in anticipation of the plunder his successes would bring. Diodorus Siculus reports that the whole strait between Rhodes and the mainland was filled by Demetrius’ armada.

== Siege ==
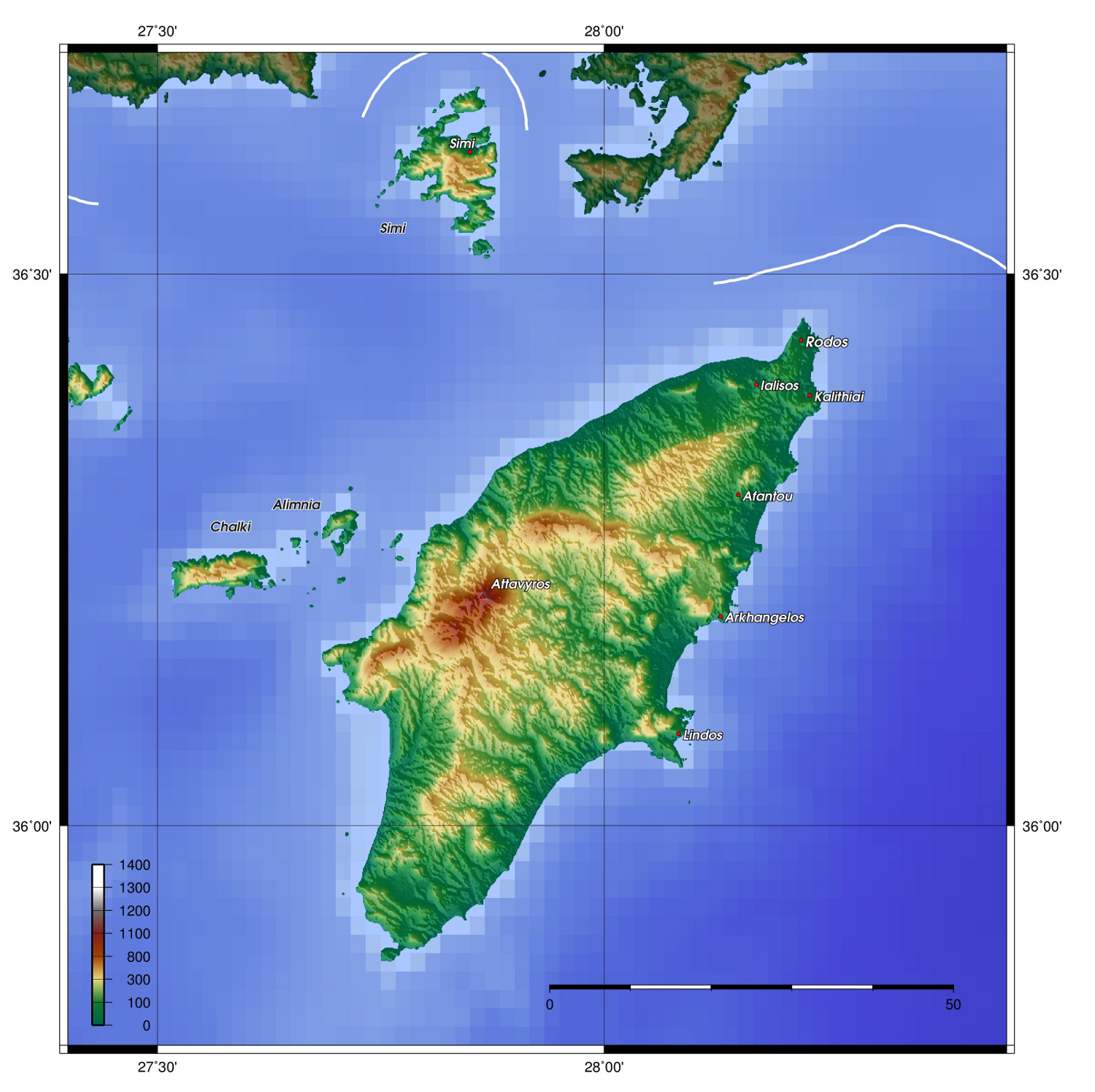
Rhodes

The city and main harbour of Rhodes was strongly fortified, and Demetrius was unable to prevent supply ships from running his blockade, so capturing the harbour was his main objective. He first built his own harbour alongside the original and constructed a mole from which he deployed a floating boom, but Demetrius ultimately never succeeded in taking the harbour. Meanwhile, his army ravaged the island and built a huge camp next to the city, but just out of missile range. Early in the siege, the walls were breached, and a number of troops entered the city, but they were all killed, and Demetrius didn't press the attack. The walls were subsequently repaired.

Both sides used many technical devices during the siege, such as mines and counter-mines and various siege engines. Demetrius even built the now notable siege tower, known as the Helepolis, in his attempt to take the city.

The citizens of Rhodes successfully repelled Demetrius’ forces over the course of the year-long siege. The costliness of the conflict encouraged both sides to come to terms, urged on by the Aetolian League and Ptolemy. The peace negotiated between Demetrius and the Rhodians prohibited the establishment of a garrison by the Antigonids in the city and ensured Rhodian autonomy. Rhodes and the Antigonids would now be allies in all conflicts except with the Ptolemies. Demetrius selected 100 hostages from prominent families to ensure the compliance of the Rhodians, but he was prohibited from picking among the current office holders.

For their assistance during the siege, Lysimachus and Cassander were voted honours by the Rhodians and statues were constructed to commemorate the shipments of grain they provided during the siege. Ptolemy was esteemed higher. After a delegation was sent to Libya to consult Ammon over the matter, the Rhodians constructed a temple to the now deified Ptolemy.

Several years later the Helepolis, which had been abandoned, had its metal plating melted down and - along with the money from selling the remains of the siege engines and equipment left behind by Demetrius - was used to erect a statue of their sun god, Helios, now known as the Colossus of Rhodes, to commemorate their heroic resistance.

== Popular culture ==
L. Sprague de Camp used the siege and the building of the Colossus in one of his historical novels, The Bronze God of Rhodes.

Alfred Duggan's novel on the life of Demetrius, Elephants and Castles, also covers the siege.

The fifth novel in Christian Cameron's Tyrant series, Destroyer of Cities, features the siege of Rhodes.

Emma Lazarus wrote a poem contrasting the Statue of Liberty to Colossus titled The New Colossus.
