= Richard Billows =

American historian of the Greek Classical period

Richard A. Billows is a professor of history at Columbia University. His specialty is the Classical Mediterranean, especially the Hellenistic World post-Alexander. He holds an undergraduate degree in history from Oxford University (1978), where he was a member of Balliol College. He earned an M.A. from King's College, University of London (1979) and a Ph.D. from the University of California, Berkeley (1985). His scholarly works include Antigonos the One-Eyed and the Creation of the Hellenic State (1990), Kings and Colonists: Aspects of Macedonian Imperialism (1995) and Marathon - How One Battle Changed Western Civilization (2010). He has taught Columbia's undergraduate survey course in Ancient Greek History. He also regularly teaches “An Introduction to Contemporary Civilization in the West,” a Columbia College core curriculum class.
