= List of wars involving Greece =

This is a list of known wars, conflicts, battles/sieges, missions and operations involving ancient Greek city states and kingdoms, Magna Graecia, other Greek colonies (First Greek colonisation, Second Greek colonisation, Greeks in pre-Roman Crimea, Greeks in pre-Roman Gaul, Greeks in Egypt, Greeks in Syria, Greeks in Malta), Greek Kingdoms of Hellenistic period, Indo-Greek Kingdom, Greco-Bactrian Kingdom, Byzantine Empire/ Byzantine Greeks, Byzantine Greek successor states of the Byzantine Empire, Kingdom of Greece and the Third Hellenic Republic between 3000 BC and the present day. It is not exhaustive.

== Bronze Age, Aegean civilizations ==
=== Mycenaean Period ===
War	Start of the war	Finish of the war	Notes
Trojan War	ca. 1194 BC	ca. 1184 BC	The years the war took place are unknown, as a result several dates are given. The poet Homer wrote about this war in his epic poem Iliad.

== Ancient Greece ==
=== Dark Ages ===
War	Start of the war	Finish of the war	Notes
Dorian invasion	?	?	This is when the mysterious Dorians invaded Greece. This is why it is named Dorian invasion. It is still unknown what the Dorians' real name is. This is not classified as a war but it was still important in the Greeks' history.

=== Archaic period ===
War	Start of the war	Finish of the war	Battle/siege	Year of battle/siege
First Messenian War	743 BC	724 BC		
Lelantine War	710 BC	650 BC		
Meliac war	690 BC (?)	670 BC (?)		
Second Messenian War	685 BC (?)	668 BC (?)	Battle of Deres	684 BC
Second Messenian War	685 BC (?)	668 BC (?)	Battle of the Great Foss	682 BC
Argos against Sparta			Battle of Hysiae	669 BC
First Sacred War	595 BC	585 BC	Siege of Kirrha	585 BC
Greco-Punic Wars	580 BC	306 BC		
Arcadia against Sparta			Battle of the Fetters	c. 550 BC
Argos against Sparta			Battle of the 300 Champions / Battle of Thyrea	546 BC
Pisistratus against Athens			Battle of Pallene	546 BC
Phocaeans against Etruscans and Carthaginians			Battle of Alalia	Between 540 BC and 535 BC

=== Classical Period ===
==== 5th century BC ====
War	Start of the war	Finish of the war	Name of conflict	Start of the conflict	Finish of the conflict	Battle/siege	Years of battle / siege
Greco-Persian Wars	499 BC	449 BC				Siege of Naxos	499 BCE
Greco-Persian Wars	499 BC	449 BC	Ionian Revolt	499 BC	493 BC	Siege of Sardis	498 BCE
Greco-Persian Wars	499 BC	449 BC	Ionian Revolt	499 BC	493 BC	Battle of Ephesus	498 BC
Greco-Persian Wars	499 BC	449 BC	Ionian Revolt	499 BC	493 BC	Revolts at Cyprus	498–497 BC
Greco-Persian Wars	499 BC	449 BC	Ionian Revolt	499 BC	493 BC	Battle of Marsyas	496 BC
Greco-Persian Wars	499 BC	449 BC	Ionian Revolt	499 BC	493 BC	Battle of Labraunda	496 BC
Greco-Persian Wars	499 BC	449 BC	Ionian Revolt	499 BC	493 BC	Battle of Pedasus	496 BC
Greco-Persian Wars	499 BC	449 BC	Ionian Revolt	499 BC	493 BC	Battle of Lade	494 BC
Greco-Persian Wars	499 BC	449 BC	Ionian Revolt	499 BC	493 BC	Battle of Miletus	494 BC
Greco-Persian Wars	499 BC	449 BC	Ionian Revolt	499 BC	493 BC	Battle of Chios	493 BC
Greco-Persian Wars	499 BC	449 BC	Ionian Revolt	499 BC	493 BC	Battle of Malene	493 BC
Greco-Persian Wars	499 BC	449 BC	First Persian invasion of Greece	492 BC	490 BC	Siege of Lindos	490 BC
Greco-Persian Wars	499 BC	449 BC	First Persian invasion of Greece	492 BC	490 BC	Siege of Naxos	490 BC
Greco-Persian Wars	499 BC	449 BC	First Persian invasion of Greece	492 BC	490 BC	Siege of Karystos	490 BC
Greco-Persian Wars	499 BC	449 BC	First Persian invasion of Greece	492 BC	490 BC	Siege of Eretria	490 BC
Greco-Persian Wars	499 BC	449 BC	First Persian invasion of Greece	492 BC	490 BC	Battle of Marathon	490 BC
Greco-Persian Wars	499 BC	449 BC	Second Persian invasion of Greece	480 BC	479 BC	Battle of Thermopylae	480 BC
Greco-Persian Wars	499 BC	449 BC	Second Persian invasion of Greece	480 BC	479 BC	Battle of Artemisium	480 BC
Greco-Persian Wars	499 BC	449 BC	Second Persian invasion of Greece	480 BC	479 BC	Battle of Salamis	480 BC
Greco-Persian Wars	499 BC	449 BC	Second Persian invasion of Greece	480 BC	479 BC	Siege of Potidea	480 BC
Greco-Persian Wars	499 BC	449 BC	Second Persian invasion of Greece	480 BC	479 BC	Siege of Olynthus	479 BCE
Greco-Persian Wars	499 BC	449 BC	Second Persian invasion of Greece	480 BC	479 BC	Battle of Plataea	479 BC
Greco-Persian Wars	499 BC	449 BC	Second Persian invasion of Greece	480 BC	479 BC	Battle of Mycale	479 BC
Greco-Persian Wars	499 BC	449 BC	Greek counterattack	479 BC	478 BC	Siege of Sestos	479 BC-478 BC
Greco-Persian Wars	499 BC	449 BC	Greek counterattack	479 BC	478 BC	Siege of Byzantium	478 BC
Greco-Persian Wars	499 BC	449 BC	Wars of the Delian League	477 BC	449 BC	Siege of Eion	477–476 BC or 476–475 BC
Greco-Persian Wars	499 BC	449 BC	Wars of the Delian League	477 BC	449 BC	Battle of the Eurymedon	466 BC
Greco-Persian Wars	499 BC	449 BC	Wars of the Delian League	477 BC	449 BC	Battle of Papremis	460 BC
Greco-Persian Wars	499 BC	449 BC	Wars of the Delian League	477 BC	449 BC	Siege of Memphis	459–455 BC
Greco-Persian Wars	499 BC	449 BC	Wars of the Delian League	477 BC	449 BC	Siege of Prosopitis	455 BC
Greco-Persian Wars	499 BC	449 BC	Wars of the Delian League	477 BC	449 BC	Battle of Mendesium	455 BC
Greco-Persian Wars	499 BC	449 BC	Wars of the Delian League	477 BC	449 BC	Siege of Kition	450 BC
Greco-Persian Wars	499 BC	449 BC	Wars of the Delian League	477 BC	449 BC	Battle of Salamis	450 BC
Greco-Punic Wars	580 BCE	306 BCE	First Sicilian War	480 BC	480 BC	Battle of Himera	480 BC
Greco-Punic Wars	580 BCE	306 BCE	Second Sicilian War	410 BC	404 BC	Battle of Selinus	409 BCE
Greco-Punic Wars	580 BCE	306 BCE	Second Sicilian War	410 BC	404 BC	Second Battle of Himera	409 BC
Greco-Punic Wars	580 BCE	306 BCE	Second Sicilian War	410 BC	404 BC	Siege of Akragas	406 BC
Greco-Punic Wars	580 BCE	306 BCE	Second Sicilian War	410 BC	404 BC	Battle of Gela	405 BC
Greco-Punic Wars	580 BCE	306 BCE	Second Sicilian War	410 BC	404 BC	Sack of Camarina	405 BC
Delian League against Greek states (Before the First Peloponnesian War)	476 BC	460 BC				Attack on Skyros	476 BC or 475 BC
Delian League against Greek states (Before the First Peloponnesian War)	476 BC	460 BC				Attack on Naxos	c. 471 BC
Delian League against Greek states (Before the First Peloponnesian War)	476 BC	460 BC	Thasian rebellion	465 BC	465 BC	Siege of Thasos	465 BC
Cleomenes I against Argos						Battle of Sepeia	494 BC
Syracuse and Cumae against Etruscans						Battle of Cumae	474 BC
First Peloponnesian War	460 BC	445 BC				Battle of Aegina	458 BC
First Peloponnesian War	460 BC	445 BC				Battle of Tanagra	457 BC
First Peloponnesian War	460 BC	445 BC				Battle of Oenophyta	457 BC
First Peloponnesian War	460 BC	445 BC	Second Sacred War	449 BC	448 BC	Battle of Delphi	
First Peloponnesian War	460 BC	445 BC				Battle of Coronea	447 BC
Samian War	440 BC	439 BC					
Battles which led to the Peloponnesian War						Battle of Sybota	433 BC
Battles which led to the Peloponnesian War						Battle of Potidaea	432 BC
Peloponnesian War	431 BC	404 BC	Archidamian War	431 BC	421 BC	Battle of Spartolos	429 BC
Peloponnesian War	431 BC	404 BC	Archidamian War	431 BC	421 BC	Siege of Plataea	429–427 BC
Peloponnesian War	431 BC	404 BC	Archidamian War	431 BC	421 BC	Battle of Naupactus	429 BC
Peloponnesian War	431 BC	404 BC	Archidamian War	431 BC	421 BC	Battle of Rhium	429 BC
Peloponnesian War	431 BC	404 BC	Archidamian War	431 BC	421 BC	Mytilenean revolt	428–427 BC
Peloponnesian War	431 BC	404 BC	Archidamian War	431 BC	421 BC	Battle of Tanagra	426 BC
Peloponnesian War	431 BC	404 BC	Archidamian War	431 BC	421 BC	Aetolian campaign	426 BC
Peloponnesian War	431 BC	404 BC	Archidamian War	431 BC	421 BC	Battle of Olpae	426 BC
Peloponnesian War	431 BC	404 BC	Archidamian War	431 BC	421 BC	Battle of Idomene	426 BC
Peloponnesian War	431 BC	404 BC	Archidamian War	431 BC	421 BC	Battle of Delium	424 BC
Peloponnesian War	431 BC	404 BC	Archidamian War	431 BC	421 BC	Battle of Megara	424 BC
Peloponnesian War	431 BC	404 BC	Archidamian War	431 BC	421 BC	Battle of Pylos	425 BC
Peloponnesian War	431 BC	404 BC	Archidamian War	431 BC	421 BC	Battle of Sphacteria	425 BC
Peloponnesian War	431 BC	404 BC	Archidamian War	431 BC	421 BC	Battle of Amphipolis	422 BC
Peloponnesian War	431 BC	404 BC	The years after the "Peace of Nicias"	420 BC	415 BC	Battle of Mantinea	418 BC
Peloponnesian War	431 BC	404 BC	The years after the "Peace of Nicias"	420 BC	415 BC	Battle of Hysiae	417 BC
Peloponnesian War	431 BC	404 BC	The years after the "Peace of Nicias"	420 BC	415 BC	Battle of Orneae	417 BC
Peloponnesian War	431 BC	404 BC	The years after the "Peace of Nicias"	420 BC	415 BC	Battle of Melos	416 BC
Peloponnesian War	431 BC	404 BC	Sicilian Expedition	415 BC	413 BC	Attack on Hyccara	415 BCE
Peloponnesian War	431 BC	404 BC	Sicilian Expedition	415 BC	413 BC	Battle of Syracuse	415 BCE-413 BC
Peloponnesian War	431 BC	404 BC	Decelean / Ionian War	413 BC	404 BC	Siege of Miletus	412 BC
Peloponnesian War	431 BC	404 BC	Decelean / Ionian War	413 BC	404 BC	Battle of Panormus	412 BC
Peloponnesian War	431 BC	404 BC	Decelean / Ionian War	413 BC	404 BC	Battle of Miletus	412 BC
Peloponnesian War	431 BC	404 BC	Decelean / Ionian War	413 BC	404 BC	Battle of Eretria	411 BC
Peloponnesian War	431 BC	404 BC	Decelean / Ionian War	413 BC	404 BC	Battle of Syme	411 BC
Peloponnesian War	431 BC	404 BC	Decelean / Ionian War	413 BC	404 BC	Battle of Cynossema	411 BC
Peloponnesian War	431 BC	404 BC	Decelean / Ionian War	413 BC	404 BC	Battle of Cyzicus	410 BC
Peloponnesian War	431 BC	404 BC	Decelean / Ionian War	413 BC	404 BC	Battle of Abydos	410 BC
Peloponnesian War	431 BC	404 BC	Decelean / Ionian War	413 BC	404 BC	Siege of Chalcedon	408 BC
Peloponnesian War	431 BC	404 BC	Decelean / Ionian War	413 BC	404 BC	Siege of Byzantium	408 BC
Peloponnesian War	431 BC	404 BC	Decelean / Ionian War	413 BC	404 BC	Battle of Notium	407 BC
Peloponnesian War	431 BC	404 BC	Decelean / Ionian War	413 BC	404 BC	Battle of Mytilene	406 BC
Peloponnesian War	431 BC	404 BC	Decelean / Ionian War	413 BC	404 BC	Battle of Notium	406 BC
Peloponnesian War	431 BC	404 BC	Decelean / Ionian War	413 BC	404 BC	Battle of Arginusae	406 BC
Peloponnesian War	431 BC	404 BC	Decelean / Ionian War	413 BC	404 BC	Battle of Aegospotami	405 BC
Phyle Campaign	404 BC	403 BC				Battle of Phyle	404 BC
Phyle Campaign	404 BC	403 BC				Battle of Munichia	404 BC or 403 BC
Phyle Campaign	404 BC	403 BC				Battle of Piraeus	403 BC
Elean War	c. 401 BC	c. 399 BC					

Notes	Battle	Year of battle
In these battles was not a Greek State, but a large army of Greek mercenaries that helped the Cyrus the Younger. Xenophon wrote about this army of Greek mercenaries, in his work Anabasis.	Battle of Cunaxa	401 BC
In these battles was not a Greek State, but a large army of Greek mercenaries that helped the Cyrus the Younger. Xenophon wrote about this army of Greek mercenaries, in his work Anabasis.	Battles between the Ten Thousand and the Persian army during their route back to Greece.	401–399 BC

==== 4th century BC ====
War	Start of the war	Finish of the war	Name of conflict	Start of the conflict	Finish of the conflict	Battle/siege	Year of battle
Greco-Punic Wars	580 BC	306 BC	Third Sicilian War	398 BC	392 BC	Siege of Motya	398 BC
Greco-Punic Wars	580 BC	306 BC	Third Sicilian War	398 BC	392 BC	Siege of Segesta	398–397 BC
Greco-Punic Wars	580 BC	306 BC	Third Sicilian War	398 BC	392 BC	Battle of Messene	397 BC
Greco-Punic Wars	580 BC	306 BC	Third Sicilian War	398 BC	392 BC	Battle of Catana	397 BC
Greco-Punic Wars	580 BC	306 BC	Third Sicilian War	398 BC	392 BC	Siege of Syracuse	397 BC
Greco-Punic Wars	580 BC	306 BC	Third Sicilian War	398 BC	392 BC	Siege of Tauromenium	394 BC
Greco-Punic Wars	580 BC	306 BC	Third Sicilian War	398 BC	392 BC	Battle of Abacaenum	393 BC
Greco-Punic Wars	580 BC	306 BC	Third Sicilian War	398 BC	392 BC	Battle of Chrysas	392 BC
Spartan-Persian War	396 BC	394 BC				Battle of Sardis	395 BC
Corinthian War	395 BC	386 BC				Battle of Haliartus	395 BC
Corinthian War	395 BC	386 BC				Battle of Coronea	394 BC
Corinthian War	395 BC	386 BC				Battle of Cnidus	394 BC
Corinthian War	395 BC	386 BC				Battle of Nemea	394 BC
Corinthian War	395 BC	386 BC				Battle of Lechaeum	391 BC
Bosporan–Sindian War	389 BC	380 BC				Battle of Labrytae	c. 380 BC
Bosporan–Heracleote War	389 BC	360 BC				Siege of Theodosia	389 BC
Bosporan–Heracleote War	389 BC	360 BC				Siege of Theodosia	c. 365 BC
Bosporan–Heracleote War	389 BC	360 BC				Siege of Theodosia	c. 360 BC
Dionysius I's battles						Battle of the Elleporus	389 BC
Dionysius I's battles						Siege of Rhegium	386 BC
Greco-Punic Wars	580 BC	306 BC	Fourth Sicilian War	383 BC	376 BC	Battle of Cabala	c. 379 BC
Greco-Punic Wars	580 BC	306 BC	Fourth Sicilian War	383 BC	376 BC	Battle of Cronium	c. 376 BC
Greco-Punic Wars	580 BC	306 BC	Fifth Sicilian War	368 BC	367 BC	Siege of Lilybaeum	368 BC
Theban–Spartan War	378 BC	362 BC	Boeotian War	378 BC	371 BC	Battle of Naxos	376 BC
Theban–Spartan War	378 BC	362 BC	Boeotian War	378 BC	371 BC	Battle of Tegyra	375 BC
Theban–Spartan War	378 BC	362 BC	Wars of the Theban hegemony	371 BC	362 BC	Battle of Leuctra	371 BC
Theban–Spartan War	378 BC	362 BC	Wars of the Theban hegemony	371 BC	362 BC	Battle of Cynoscephalae	364 BC
Theban–Spartan War	378 BC	362 BC	Wars of the Theban hegemony	371 BC	362 BC	Battle of Mantinea	362 BC
Philip II's campaigns	359 BC	336 BC				Battle of Methone	359 BC
Philip II's campaigns	359 BC	336 BC				Battle of Erigon Valley	358 BC
Philip II's campaigns	359 BC	336 BC				Siege of Amphipolis	357 BC
Philip II's campaigns	359 BC	336 BC				Siege of Pydna	357 BC or 356 BC
Philip II's campaigns	359 BC	336 BC				Siege of Potidea	356 BC
Philip II's campaigns	359 BC	336 BC				Siege of Methone	355–354 BC or 354–353 BC
Philip II's campaigns	359 BC	336 BC	Third Sacred War	356 BC	346 BC	Battle of Crocus Field	353 or 352 BC
Philip II's campaigns	359 BC	336 BC	Olynthian War	349 BC	348 BC		
Philip II's campaigns	359 BC	336 BC				Siege of Perinthus	340–339 BC
Philip II's campaigns	359 BC	336 BC				Siege of Byzantion	340 BC
Philip II's campaigns	359 BC	336 BC	Fourth Sacred War	339 BC	338 BC	Battle of Chaeronea	338 BC
Social War	357 BC	355 BC				Battle of Embata	356 BC
Third Sacred War	356 BC	346 BC				Battle of Delphi	356 BC
Third Sacred War	356 BC	346 BC				Battle of Neon	355 BC
Third Sacred War	356 BC	346 BC				Battle of Crocus Field	353 BC
Third Sacred War	356 BC	346 BC				Battle of Thermopylae	352 BC
Third Sacred War	356 BC	346 BC				Battle of Tamynae	350 BC
Foreign War	346 BC	343 BC				Siege of Lyttos	346 BC
Foreign War	346 BC	343 BC				Siege of Kydonia	343 BC
Greco–Punic Wars	580 BC	306 BC	Sixth Sicilian War	345 BC	339 BC	Siege of Syracuse	344–343 BC
Greco–Punic Wars	580 BC	306 BC	Sixth Sicilian War	345 BC	339 BC	Battle of the Crimissus	339 BC
Alexander the Great's Balkan campaign	335 BC	335 BC				Siege of Pelium	335 BC
Alexander the Great's Balkan campaign	335 BC	335 BC				Battle of Thebes	335 BC
Alexander the Great's campaign in Asia	334 BC	323 BC	Persian campaign			Battle of the Granicus	334 BC
Alexander the Great's campaign in Asia	334 BC	323 BC	Persian campaign			Siege of Miletus	334 BC
Alexander the Great's campaign in Asia	334 BC	323 BC	Persian campaign			Siege of Halicarnassus	334 BC
Alexander the Great's campaign in Asia	334 BC	323 BC	Persian campaign			Battle of Issus	333 BC
Alexander the Great's campaign in Asia	334 BC	323 BC	Persian campaign			Siege of Tyre	332 BC
Alexander the Great's campaign in Asia	334 BC	323 BC	Persian campaign			Siege of Gaza	332 BC
Alexander the Great's campaign in Asia	334 BC	323 BC	Persian campaign			Battle of Gaugamela	331 BC
Alexander the Great's campaign in Asia	334 BC	323 BC	Persian campaign			Battle of the Persian Gate	331 BC
Alexander the Great's campaign in Asia	334 BC	323 BC	Persian campaign			Battle of Jaxartes	329 BC
Alexander the Great's campaign in Asia	334 BC	323 BC	Persian campaign			Battle of Gabai	328 BC
Alexander the Great's campaign in Asia	334 BC	323 BC	Persian campaign			Siege of the Sogdian Rock	327 BC
Alexander the Great's campaign in Asia	334 BC	323 BC	Indian campaign			Cophen Campaign	327–326 BC
Alexander the Great's campaign in Asia	334 BC	323 BC	Indian campaign			Siege of Aornos	326 BC
Alexander the Great's campaign in Asia	334 BC	323 BC	Indian campaign			Battle of the Hydaspes	326 BC
Alexander the Great's campaign in Asia	334 BC	323 BC	Indian campaign			Mallian Campaign	326–325 BC
Sparta against Macedon						Battle of Megalopolis	331 BC
Epirus against Italic tribes						Battle of Pandosia	331 BC

=== Hellenistic Period ===
( * ) The Kingdom of Pergamon helped the Roman Republic.

War	Start of the war	End of the war	Name of the conflict	Start of the conflict	End of the conflict	Name of battle / siege	Years of battle / siege
Lamian War	323 BC	322 BC				Battle of Plataea	323 BC
Lamian War	323 BC	322 BC				Battle of Thermopylae	323 BC
Lamian War	323 BC	322 BC				Siege of Lamia	323–322 BC
Lamian War	323 BC	322 BC				Battle of the Echinades	322 BC
Lamian War	323 BC	322 BC				Battle of Melitaea	322 BC
Lamian War	323 BC	322 BC				Battle of Amorgos	322 BC
Lamian War	323 BC	322 BC				Battle of Crannon	322 BC
Wars of the Diadochi	322 BC	281 BC	First War of the Diadochi	322 BC	320 BC	Battle of the Hellespont	321 BC
Wars of the Diadochi	322 BC	281 BC	Second War of the Diadochi	319 BC	315 BC	Battle of Paraitakene	317 BC
Wars of the Diadochi	322 BC	281 BC	Second War of the Diadochi	319 BC	315 BC	Battle of Gabiene	316 BC
Wars of the Diadochi	322 BC	281 BC	Second War of the Diadochi	319 BC	315 BC	Siege of Pydna	317–316 or 315 BC
Wars of the Diadochi	322 BC	281 BC	Third War of the Diadochi	314 BC	311 BC	Battle of Gaza	312 BC
Wars of the Diadochi	322 BC	281 BC	Babylonian War	311 BC	309 BC	First siege of Babylon	311 BC
Wars of the Diadochi	322 BC	281 BC	Babylonian War	311 BC	309 BC	Battle of the 25 of Abu	309 BC
Wars of the Diadochi	322 BC	281 BC	Fourth War of the Diadochi	308 BC	301 BC	Battle of Salamis	306 BC
Wars of the Diadochi	322 BC	281 BC	Fourth War of the Diadochi	308 BC	301 BC	Siege of Rhodes	305–304 BC
Wars of the Diadochi	322 BC	281 BC	Fourth War of the Diadochi	308 BC	301 BC	Battle of Ipsus	301 BC
Wars of the Diadochi	322 BC	281 BC	The struggle over Macedon	298 BC	284 BC		
Wars of the Diadochi	322 BC	281 BC	The struggle of Lysimachus and Seleucus	284 BC	281 BC	Battle of Corupedium	281 BC
Greco–Punic Wars	580 BC	306 BC	Seventh Sicilian War	311 BC	306 BC	Battle of Himera	311 BC
Greco–Punic Wars	580 BC	306 BC	Seventh Sicilian War	311 BC	306 BC	Siege of Syracuse	311–309 BC
Greco–Punic Wars	580 BC	306 BC	Seventh Sicilian War	311 BC	306 BC	Agathocles' expedition to Africa	310–307 BC
Greco–Punic Wars	580 BC	306 BC	Seventh Sicilian War	311 BC	306 BC	Battle of White Tunis	310 BC
Seleucid–Mauryan War	305 BC	303 BC					
Boeotian revolt						Siege of Thebes	292–291 BC
Wars of Pyrrhus	292 BC	272 BC	Invasion of Thessaly	292 BC			
Wars of Pyrrhus	292 BC	272 BC	Pyrrhic War	280 BC	275 BC	Battle of Heraclea	280 BC
Wars of Pyrrhus	292 BC	272 BC	Pyrrhic War	280 BC	275 BC	Battle of Asculum	279 BC
Wars of Pyrrhus	292 BC	272 BC	Pyrrhic War	280 BC	275 BC	Siege of Syracuse	278 BC
Wars of Pyrrhus	292 BC	272 BC	Pyrrhic War	280 BC	275 BC	Siege of Lilybaeum	278 BC
Wars of Pyrrhus	292 BC	272 BC	Pyrrhic War	280 BC	275 BC	Battle of the Cranita hills	277 BC
Wars of Pyrrhus	292 BC	272 BC	Pyrrhic War	280 BC	275 BC	Battle of the Strait of Messina	276 BC
Wars of Pyrrhus	292 BC	272 BC	Pyrrhic War	280 BC	275 BC	Battle of Beneventum	275 BC
Wars of Pyrrhus	292 BC	272 BC	Pyrrhus's invasion of the Peloponnese	272 BC	272 BC	Siege of Sparta	272 BC
Wars of Pyrrhus	292 BC	272 BC	Pyrrhus's invasion of the Peloponnese	272 BC	272 BC	Battle of Argos	272 BC
Damascene War	280 BC	279 BC					
Gallic invasions of Greece	280 BC	275 BC				Battle of Thermopylae	279 BC
Gallic invasions of Greece	280 BC	275 BC				Battle of Delphi	279 BC
Syrian Wars	274 BC	168 BC	First Syrian War	274 BC	271 BC		
Syrian Wars	274 BC	168 BC	Second Syrian War	260 BC	253 BC		
Syrian Wars	274 BC	168 BC	Third Syrian War	246 BC	241 BC	Battle of Andros	246 BC
Syrian Wars	274 BC	168 BC	Fourth Syrian War	219 BC	217 BC	Battle of Raphia	217 BC
Syrian Wars	274 BC	168 BC	Fifth Syrian War	202 BC	195 BC	Battle of Panium	200 BC
Syrian Wars	274 BC	168 BC	Sixth Syrian War	170 BC	168 BC		
Chremonidean War	267 BC	261 BC					
Antigonid Macedonia against Ptolemaic Egypt						Battle of Cos	Within the period 262–256 BC
Seleucid Empire civil war						Battle of Ancyra	237 BC
Seleucid–Parthian wars	238 BC	129 BC				Parni conquest of Parthia	238 BC
Seleucid–Parthian wars	238 BC	129 BC				Battle of Ecbatana	129 BC
Seleucid Empire against the Attalid kingdom						Battle of the Harpasus	229 BC
Illyrian Wars	229 BC	168 BC				Siege of Medion	231 BC
Illyrian Wars	229 BC	168 BC				Battle of Phoenice	230 BC
Illyrian Wars	229 BC	168 BC				Battle of Paxos	229 BC
Cleomenean War	229/228 BC	222 BC				Battle of Ladoceia	227 BC
Cleomenean War	229/228 BC	222 BC				Battle of Dyme	226 BC
Cleomenean War	229/228 BC	222 BC				Battle of Sellasia	222 BC
Lyttian War	c. 220 BC	c. 216 BC					
Social War	220 BC	217 BC					
Second Punic War	218 BC	201 BC				Siege of Syracuse	214–212 BC
Macedonian Wars	214 BC	148 BC	First Macedonian War	214 BC	205 BC	First Battle of Lamia	209 BC
Macedonian Wars	214 BC	148 BC	First Macedonian War	214 BC	205 BC	Second Battle of Lamia	209 BC
Macedonian Wars	214 BC	148 BC	First Macedonian War	214 BC	205 BC	Battle of Mantinea	207 BC
Macedonian Wars	214 BC	148 BC	Second Macedonian War	200 BC	197 BC	Battle of Cynoscephalae	197 BC
Macedonian Wars	214 BC	148 BC	Third Macedonian War	171 BC	168 BC	Battle of Callinicus	171 BC
Macedonian Wars	214 BC	148 BC	Third Macedonian War	171 BC	168 BC	Battle of Pydna	168 BC
Macedonian Wars	214 BC	148 BC	Fourth Macedonian War	150 BC	148 BC	Battle of Pydna	148 BC
Seleucid Empire against the Greco-Bactrian Kingdom	208 BC	206 BC				Battle of the Arius	208 BC
Seleucid Empire against the Greco-Bactrian Kingdom	208 BC	206 BC				Siege of Bactra	208–206 BC
Cretan War	205 BC	200 BC				Battle of Chios	201 BC
Cretan War	205 BC	200 BC				Battle of Lade	201 BC
War against Nabis/ Laconian War	195 BC	195 BC				Battle of Gythium	195 BC
War against Nabis/ Laconian War	195 BC	195 BC				Siege of Sparta	195 BC
Roman–Seleucid War	192 BC	188 BC				Battle of Thermopylae	191 BC
Roman–Seleucid War	192 BC	188 BC				Battle of Magnesia	190 BC
Roman–Seleucid War	192 BC	188 BC				Battle of the Eurymedon	190 BC
Roman–Seleucid War	192 BC	188 BC				Battle of Myonessus	190 BC
Roman–Seleucid War	192 BC	188 BC				Battle of Magnesia	190 BC
Galatian War *	189 BC	189 BC				Battle of Mount Olympus	189 BC
Maccabean Revolt	167 BC	160 BC				Battle of Wadi Haramia	167 BC
Maccabean Revolt	167 BC	160 BC				Battle of Beth Horon	166 BC
Maccabean Revolt	167 BC	160 BC				Battle of Emmaus	166 BC
Maccabean Revolt	167 BC	160 BC				Battle of Beth Zur	164 BC
Maccabean Revolt	167 BC	160 BC				Battle of Dathema	163 BC
Maccabean Revolt	167 BC	160 BC				Battle of Beth Zechariah	162 BC
Maccabean Revolt	167 BC	160 BC				Battle of Adasa	161 BC
Maccabean Revolt	167 BC	160 BC				Battle of Elasa	160 BC
Seleucid Dynastic Wars	157 BC	63 BC					
Achaean War	146 BC	146 BC				Battle of Scarpheia	146 BC
Achaean War	146 BC	146 BC				Battle of Corinth	146 BC
Seleucid Empire against Ptolemaic Egypt						Battle of Antioch	145 BC
War of the Heavenly Horses	104 BC	101 BC					
Seleucid Empire against the Nabataean Kingdom						Battle of Cana	84 BC

== Medieval Greece ==
In 330, Constantine the Great moved the capital of the Roman Empire from Rome to Constantinople. The Eastern part of the Roman Empire was already heavily Hellenized.

=== 330–628 ===
War	Start of the war	Finish of the war	Name of conflict	Start of the conflict	Finish of the conflict	Battle/ Siege	Years of Battle/ Siege
Byzantine–Sasanian wars	421	628	War of 421–422	421	422		
Byzantine–Sasanian wars	421	628	War of 440	440	440		
Byzantine–Sasanian wars	421	628	Anastasian War	502	506	Siege of Amida	502–503
Byzantine–Sasanian wars	421	628	Iberian War	526	532	Battle of Dara	530
Byzantine–Sasanian wars	421	628	Iberian War	526	532	Battle of Callinicum	531
Byzantine–Sasanian wars	421	628	Lazic War	541	562		
Byzantine–Sasanian wars	421	628	War of 572–591	572	592	Battle of Melitene	576
Byzantine–Sasanian wars	421	628	War of 572–591	572	592	Battle of Solachon	586
Byzantine–Sasanian wars	421	628	War of 572–591	572	592	Battle of Martyropolis	588
Byzantine–Sasanian wars	421	628	War of 572–591	572	592	Battle of Sisauranon	589
Byzantine–Sasanian wars	421	628	War of 572–591	572	592	Battle of Blarathon	592
Byzantine–Sasanian wars	421	628	War of 602–628	602	628	Sasanian invasion of Armenia	603–610
Byzantine–Sasanian wars	421	628	War of 602–628	602	628	Battle of Antioch	613
Byzantine–Sasanian wars	421	628	War of 602–628	602	628	Jewish revolt	614–628
Byzantine–Sasanian wars	421	628	War of 602–628	602	628	Sasanian conquest of Egypt	618–621
Byzantine–Sasanian wars	421	628	War of 602–628	602	628	Heraclius' Anatolian campaign	622
Byzantine–Sasanian wars	421	628	War of 602–628	602	628	Siege of Constantinople	626
Byzantine–Sasanian wars	421	628	War of 602–628	602	628	Battle of Nineveh	627
Samaritan Revolts	484	573					
Nika riots	532	532					
Justinian's wars of Reconquest	533	554					
Justinian's wars of Reconquest	533	554	Vandalic War	533	534	Battle of Ad Decimum	533
Justinian's wars of Reconquest	533	554	Vandalic War	533	534	Battle of Tricamarum	533
Justinian's wars of Reconquest	533	554	Byzantine–Moorish wars	533	548	Ambush of Aigan and Rufinus	534
Justinian's wars of Reconquest	533	554	Byzantine–Moorish wars	533	548	Aurès campaign	539–540
Justinian's wars of Reconquest	533	554	Byzantine–Moorish wars	533	548	Battle of Sufetula	546 or 547
Justinian's wars of Reconquest	533	554	Gothic War	535	554	Siege of Panormus	535
Justinian's wars of Reconquest	533	554	Gothic War	535	554	Siege of Naples	536
Justinian's wars of Reconquest	533	554	Gothic War	535	554	Siege of Rome	537–538
Justinian's wars of Reconquest	533	554	Gothic War	535	554	Siege of Rome	549–550
Justinian's wars of Reconquest	533	554	Gothic War	535	554	Battle of Taginae	552
Justinian's wars of Reconquest	533	554	Gothic War	535	554	Battle of Mons Lactarius	552

=== 629–1204 ===
War	Start of the war	Finish of the war	Name of conflict	Start of the conflict	Finish of the conflict	Battle/ Siege	Years of Battle/ Siege
Arab–Byzantine wars	629	1054				Siege of Damascus (634)	634
Arab–Byzantine wars	629	1054				Battle of Yarmouk	636
Arab–Byzantine wars	629	1054				Siege of Constantinople	674–678
Arab–Byzantine wars	629	1054				Siege of Constantinople	717-718
Arab–Byzantine wars	629	1054				Siege of Nicaea	727
Arab–Byzantine wars	629	1054				Battle of Akroinon	740
Arab–Byzantine wars	629	1054				Sack of Amorium	838
Arab–Byzantine wars	629	1054				Battle of Lalakaon	863
Arab–Byzantine wars	629	1054	John Kourkouas' Mesopotamian campaign	942	944		
Arab–Byzantine wars	629	1054				Siege of Chandax	960–961
Arab–Byzantine wars	629	1054				Siege of Antioch	968–969
Arab–Byzantine wars	629	1054	Syrian campaigns of John Tzimiskes	974	975	Battle of Alexandretta	971
Arab–Byzantine wars	629	1054	Syrian campaigns of John Tzimiskes	974	975	Battle of Amida	972
Arab–Byzantine wars	629	1054	Syrian campaigns of John Tzimiskes	974	975	Siege of Tripoli	975
Arab–Byzantine wars	629	1054	Campaigns of Basil II	994	999	Battle of the Orontes	994
Arab–Byzantine wars	629	1054	Campaigns of Basil II	994	999	Siege of Aleppo	994–995
Arab–Byzantine wars	629	1054	Campaigns of Basil II	994	999	Battle of Apamea	998
Arab–Byzantine wars	629	1054	Campaigns of Basil II	994	999	Siege of Tripoli	999
Arab–Byzantine wars	629	1054				Battle of Azaz	1030
Byzantine–Bulgarian wars	680	1355				Battle of Ongal	680
Byzantine–Bulgarian wars	680	1355				Battle of Anchialus	708
Byzantine–Bulgarian wars	680	1355				Battle of Marcellae	756
Byzantine–Bulgarian wars	680	1355				Battle of Marcellae	792
Byzantine–Bulgarian wars	680	1355				Siege of Serdica	809
Byzantine–Bulgarian wars	680	1355				Battle of Pliska	811
Byzantine–Bulgarian wars	680	1355				Battle of Versinikia	813
Byzantine–Bulgarian wars	680	1355				Siege of Constantinople	813
Byzantine–Bulgarian wars	680	1355				Siege of Adrianople	813
Byzantine–Bulgarian wars	680	1355	Byzantine–Bulgarian war of 894–896	894	896	Battle of Boulgarophygon	896
Byzantine–Bulgarian wars	680	1355	Byzantine–Bulgarian war of 913–927	913	927	Battle of Achelous	917
Byzantine–Bulgarian wars	680	1355	Byzantine–Bulgarian war of 913–927	913	927	Battle of Pegae	921
Byzantine–Bulgarian wars	680	1355	Byzantine–Bulgarian war of 913–927	913	927	Battle of Constantinople	922
Byzantine–Bulgarian wars	680	1355	Byzantine conquest of Bulgaria	968	1018	Fall of Great Preslav	971
Byzantine–Bulgarian wars	680	1355	Byzantine conquest of Bulgaria	968	1018	Battle of the Gates of Trajan	986
Byzantine–Bulgarian wars	680	1355	Byzantine conquest of Bulgaria	968	1018	Battle of Spercheios	997
Byzantine–Bulgarian wars	680	1355	Byzantine conquest of Bulgaria	968	1018	Battle of Kleidion	1014
Byzantine–Bulgarian wars	680	1355	Byzantine conquest of Bulgaria	968	1018	Battle of Dyrrhachium	1018
Byzantine–Bulgarian wars	680	1355	Uprising of Peter Delyan	1040	1041	First Battle of Thessalonica	1040
Byzantine–Bulgarian wars	680	1355	Uprising of Peter Delyan	1040	1041	Second Battle of Thessalonica	1040
Byzantine–Bulgarian wars	680	1355	Uprising of Peter Delyan	1040	1041	Battle of Ostrovo	1041
Byzantine–Bulgarian wars	680	1355	Uprising of Georgi Voyteh	1072	1073		
Byzantine–Bulgarian wars	680	1355	Uprising of Asen and Peter	1185	1187		
Byzantine–Bulgarian wars	680	1355				Battle of Klokotnitsa	1230
Byzantine–Bulgarian wars	680	1355				Battle of Rusokastro	1332
Revolt of Bardanes Tourkos	803	803					
Siege of Patras (805 or 807)	805 or 807	805 or 807					
Revolt of Thomas the Slav	821	823				Siege of Constantinople	821–822
Rus'–Byzantine Wars			Paphlagonian expedition of the Rus'	c. 830	c. 830		
Rus'–Byzantine Wars			Rus'–Byzantine War	860	860		
Rus'–Byzantine Wars			Rus'–Byzantine War	907	907		
Rus'–Byzantine Wars			Rus'–Byzantine War	941	944		
Rus'–Byzantine Wars			Sviatoslav's invasion of Bulgaria	967/968	971	Battle of Silistra	968
Rus'–Byzantine Wars			Sviatoslav's invasion of Bulgaria	967/968	971	Battle of Arcadiopolis	970
Rus'–Byzantine Wars			Sviatoslav's invasion of Bulgaria	967/968	971	Siege of Dorostolon	971
Rus'–Byzantine Wars			Rus'–Byzantine War	1024	1024	Battle of Lemnos	1024
Rus'–Byzantine Wars			Rus'–Byzantine War	1043	1043		
Byzantine–Georgian wars	1014	1051				Battle of Shirimni	1021
Byzantine–Georgian wars	1014	1051				Battle of Sasireti	1042
Revolt of Leo Tornikios	1047	1047				Siege of Constantinople	1047
Byzantine–Seljuk wars	1048	1308				Battle of Kapetron	1048
Byzantine–Seljuk wars	1048	1308	Alp Arslan's raids into Anatolia	1063	1070		
Byzantine–Seljuk wars	1048	1308				Battle of Manzikert	1071
Byzantine–Seljuk wars	1048	1308				Siege of Nicaea	1097
Byzantine–Seljuk wars	1048	1308				Battle of Myriokephalon	1176
Byzantine–Seljuk wars	1048	1308				Battle of Hyelion and Leimocheir	1177
Byzantine–Seljuk wars	1048	1308				Siege of Trebizond	1205–1206
Byzantine–Seljuk wars	1048	1308				Battle of Antioch on the Meander	1211
Byzantine–Seljuk wars	1048	1308				Siege of Sinope	1214
Byzantine–Seljuk wars	1048	1308	Nicaean–Seljuk war (1225–1231)	1225	1231		
Byzantine–Norman wars	1040	1189				Siege of Bari	1068–1071
Byzantine–Norman wars	1040	1189	First Norman Invasion of the Balkans	1081	1085	Battle of Dyrrhachium	1081
Byzantine–Norman wars	1040	1189	Byzantine–Norman war (1147–1149)	1147	1149		
Byzantine–Norman wars	1040	1189				Battle of Brindisi	1156
Byzantine–Norman wars	1040	1189	Third Norman invasion of the Balkans	1185	1186	Sack of Thessalonica	1185
Byzantine–Norman wars	1040	1189	Third Norman invasion of the Balkans	1185	1186	Battle of Demetritzes	1185
Byzantine–Hungarian Wars			Hungarian invasions of Europe	c. 800	970	Battle of W.l.n.d.r	934
Byzantine–Hungarian Wars			Byzantine–Hungarian War (1071–1072)	1071	1072	Siege of Belgrade	1071
Byzantine–Hungarian Wars			Byzantine–Hungarian War (1127–1129)	1127	1129	Battle of Haram	1128
Byzantine–Hungarian Wars			Byzantine–Hungarian War (1149–1155)	1149	1155	Serbian revolt	1149–1150
Byzantine–Hungarian Wars			Byzantine–Hungarian War (1149–1155)	1149	1155	Siege of Braničevo	1154
Byzantine–Hungarian Wars			Byzantine–Hungarian War (1162–1167)	1162	1167	Battle of Sirmium	1167
Byzantine–Hungarian Wars			Byzantine–Hungarian War (1180–1185)	1180	1185		
Rebellion of Nikephoros Bryennios the Elder	1077	1078				Battle of Kalavrye	1078
First Crusade	1096	1099				Siege of Nicaea	1097
Second Crusade	1147	1149				Battle of Constantinople	1047
Fourth Crusade	1202	1204				First siege of Constantinople	1203
Fourth Crusade	1202	1204				Second siege of Constantinople	1204

=== 1205–1461 ===
War	Start of the war	Finish of the war	Name of conflict	Start of the conflict	Finish of the conflict	Battle/ Siege	Years of Battle/ Siege
Struggle for Constantinople and the Frankokratia						Battle of the Olive Grove of Koundouros	1205
Struggle for Constantinople and the Frankokratia						Battle of Adramyttium	1205
Struggle for Constantinople and the Frankokratia						Battle of the Rhyndacus	1211
Struggle for Constantinople and the Frankokratia						Battle of Poimanenon	1223 or 1224
Struggle for Constantinople and the Frankokratia						Siege of Constantinople	1235
Struggle for Constantinople and the Frankokratia						Siege of Rhodes	1248–1249 or 1250
Struggle for Constantinople and the Frankokratia						Battle of Pelagonia	1259
Struggle for Constantinople and the Frankokratia						Siege of Constantinople	1260
Struggle for Constantinople and the Frankokratia						Reconquest of Constantinople	1261
Struggle for Constantinople and the Frankokratia						Battle of Prinitza	1263
Struggle for Constantinople and the Frankokratia						Battle of Settepozzi	1263
Struggle for Constantinople and the Frankokratia						Battle of Makryplagi	1263 or 1264
Struggle for Constantinople and the Frankokratia						Battle of Neopatras	Between 1272 and 1275
Struggle for Constantinople and the Frankokratia						Battle of Demetrias	Between 1272 and 1275
Struggle for Constantinople and the Frankokratia						Battle of Pharsalus	1277
Struggle for Constantinople and the Frankokratia						Siege of Berat	1280–1281
Struggle for Constantinople and the Frankokratia			Byzantine–Genoese War	1348	1349		
Struggle for Constantinople and the Frankokratia						Battle of the Echinades	1427
Byzantine–Ottoman wars	1299	1453				Battle of Bapheus	1302
Byzantine–Ottoman wars	1299	1453	Catalan campaign in Asia Minor	1303	1313		
Byzantine–Ottoman wars	1299	1453				Siege of Bursa	1326
Byzantine–Ottoman wars	1299	1453				Siege of Nicaea	1328–1331
Byzantine–Ottoman wars	1299	1453				Battle of Pelekanon	1329
Byzantine–Ottoman wars	1299	1453				Siege of Nicomedia	1333–1337
Byzantine–Ottoman wars	1299	1453				Battle of Adrianople	1365
Byzantine–Ottoman wars	1299	1453				Siege of Philadelphia	1390
Byzantine–Ottoman wars	1299	1453				Siege of Constantinople	1422
Byzantine–Ottoman wars	1299	1453				Siege of Thessalonica	1422–1430
Byzantine–Ottoman wars	1299	1453				Siege of Constantinople	1453
Byzantine–Ottoman wars	1299	1453	Ottoman conquest of the Morea	1458	1460		
Byzantine–Ottoman wars	1299	1453				Siege of Trebizond	1460–1461
Byzantines against the Catalan Company						Battle of Apros	1305
Byzantine civil war	1321	1328					
Byzantine civil war	1341	1347					
Revolt of the Zealots of Thessalonica	1342	1350					
Byzantine civil war	1352	1357					
Revolt of Saint Titus	1363	1368					
Byzantine civil war	1373	1379					
Morea revolt	1453	1454					

== Modern Era ==
=== Ottoman Greece ===
==== 1461–1799 ====
( * ) Greeks helped the Christian armies.
( ** ) Greeks helped the Russian army.

By the start of the 16th century, most of modern day Greece was ruled by the Ottoman empire. Holdouts included Rhodes, conquered in 1522, Cyprus in 1571, Crete, retained by the Venetians until 1669, and the Ionian islands which remained primarily under the rule of the Republic of Venice.

War	Start of the war	Finish of the war	Name of conflict	Start of the conflict	Finish of the conflict	Battle/siege	Years of Battle / siege
Ottoman–Venetian Wars *	1463	1718	First Ottoman–Venetian War	1463	1479		
Ottoman–Venetian Wars *	1463	1718	Fourth Ottoman–Venetian War	1570	1573	Battle of Lepanto	1571
Ottoman–Venetian Wars *	1463	1718	Fourth Ottoman–Venetian War	1570	1573	Anti-Ottoman revolts of 1565–1572	1565–1572
Ottoman–Venetian Wars *	1463	1718	Fifth Ottoman–Venetian War / Cretan War	1645	1669		
Ottoman–Venetian Wars *	1463	1718	Sixth Ottoman–Venetian War / Morean War	1684	1699		
Siege of Rhodes *	1522	1522					
Revolts at Vonitsa and Epirus	1585	1585					
Himara Revolt	1596	1596					
Thessaly Revolt	1600	1601					
Epirus revolt	1611	1611					
Russo-Turkish War (1768–74) **	1768	1774	Orlov Revolt	1770	1770	Battle of Chesma	1770
Russo-Turkish War (1768–74) **	1768	1774	Revolt of Daskalogiannis	1770	1771		
Lambros Katsonis' naval battles with the Ottoman Empire	1788	1792					
Ottoman invasion of Mani	1770	1770				Siege of Grigorakos tower	1770
Ottoman invasion of Mani	1770	1770				Battle of Vromopigada	1770
Ottoman invasion of Mani	1770	1770				Siege of Kastania	1780

==== 1800–1832 ====
War	Start of the war	Finish of the war	Name of conflict	Start of the conflict	Finish of the conflict	Battle/siege	Years of battle / siege
Souliote War	1803	1803					
Ottoman invasions of Mani	1803	1803	Invasion of 1803				
Ottoman invasions of Mani	1807	1807	Invasion of 1807				
Ottoman invasions of Mani	1815	1815	Invasion of 1815				
Rebellion of Thymios Vlachavas in Thessaly	1808	1809					
Greek War of Independence	1821	1832				Liberation of Kalamata	1821
Greek War of Independence	1821	1832				Siege of Patras	1821
Greek War of Independence	1821	1832				Battle of Alamana	1821
Greek War of Independence	1821	1832				First siege of the Acropolis	1821–1822
Greek War of Independence	1821	1832				Battle of Gravia Inn	1821
Greek War of Independence	1821	1832				Battle of Doliana	1821
Greek War of Independence	1821	1832				Battle of Valtetsi	1821
Greek War of Independence	1821	1832				Siege of Tripolitsa	1821
Greek War of Independence	1821	1832				Battle of Sculeni	1821
Greek War of Independence	1821	1832				Battle of Drăgășani	1821
Greek War of Independence	1821	1832				Battle of the Trench	1821
Greek War of Independence	1821	1832				Battle of Vasilika	1821
Greek War of Independence	1821	1832				Battle of Peta	1822
Greek War of Independence	1821	1832				First siege of Missolonghi	1822
Greek War of Independence	1821	1832				Battle of Dervenakia	1822
Greek War of Independence	1821	1832				Battle of Karpenisi	1823
Greek War of Independence	1821	1832				Second siege of Missolonghi	1823
Greek War of Independence	1821	1832				Third siege of Missolonghi	1825–1826
Greek War of Independence	1821	1832				Battle of Sphacteria	1825
Greek War of Independence	1821	1832				Battle of Maniaki	1825
Greek War of Independence	1821	1832				Battle of the Lerna Mills	1825
Greek War of Independence	1821	1832				Battle of Kleisova	1826
Greek War of Independence	1821	1832				Battle of Arachova	1826
Greek War of Independence	1821	1832	Ottoman–Egyptian invasion of Mani	1826	1826	Battle of Vergas	1826
Greek War of Independence	1821	1832	Ottoman–Egyptian invasion of Mani	1826	1826	Battle of Diro	1826
Greek War of Independence	1821	1832	Ottoman–Egyptian invasion of Mani	1826	1826	Battle of Polyaravos	1826
Greek War of Independence	1821	1832				Second siege of the Acropolis	1826–1827
Greek War of Independence	1821	1832				Battle of Kamatero	1827
Greek War of Independence	1821	1832				Battle of Phaleron	1827
Greek War of Independence	1821	1832				Battle of Itea	1827
Greek War of Independence	1821	1832				Battle of Navarino	1827
Greek War of Independence	1821	1832				Chios expedition	1827
Greek War of Independence	1821	1832				Battle of Frangokastello	1828
Greek War of Independence	1821	1832				Battle of Petra	1829
Greek civil wars	1823	1825	First Greek civil war	1823	1824		
Greek civil wars	1823	1825	Second Greek civil war	1824	1825		

=== Kingdom of Greece ===
The Kingdom of Greece was established in 1832.

==== 1832–1899 ====
( * ) Greeks helped the Russian army.

War	Start of the war	Finish of the war	Name of conflict	Start of the conflict	Finish of the conflict	Battle/ Siege	Years of Battle/ Siege
Cretan Revolt (1841)	1841	1841					
Crimean War *	1853	1856				Siege of Sevastopol	1854-1855
Crimean War *	1853	1856				Battle of Eupatoria	1855
Revolts in Thessaly, Macedonia and Epirus against the Ottoman Empire	1854	1854				Battle of Filiadona	1854
Revolts in Thessaly, Macedonia and Epirus against the Ottoman Empire	1854	1854				Battle of Melissatika	1854
Revolts in Thessaly, Macedonia and Epirus against the Ottoman Empire	1854	1854				Battle of the gardens of Ano Volos	1854
Revolts in Thessaly, Macedonia and Epirus against the Ottoman Empire	1854	1854				Battle of Fyllouria	1854
Revolts in Thessaly, Macedonia and Epirus against the Ottoman Empire	1854	1854				Battle of Sphlaio	1854
Revolts in Thessaly, Macedonia and Epirus against the Ottoman Empire	1854	1854				Battle of Pedino	1854
Revolts in Thessaly, Macedonia and Epirus against the Ottoman Empire	1854	1854				Battle of Dhmario	1854
Revolts in Thessaly, Macedonia and Epirus against the Ottoman Empire	1854	1854				Battle of Skoulhkaria	1854
Revolts in Thessaly, Macedonia and Epirus against the Ottoman Empire	1854	1854				Battle of Domokos	1854
Revolts in Thessaly, Macedonia and Epirus against the Ottoman Empire	1854	1854				Battle of Thaumako	1854
Cretan Revolt against the Ottoman Empire	1858	1858					
Cretan Revolt (1866–1869)	1866	1869					
Cretan Revolt (1878)	1878	1878					
Revolts in Thessaly, Macedonia and Epirus against Ottoman Empire	1878	1878	Epirus Revolt	1878	1878	Revolt of Tzoumerka	1878
Revolts in Thessaly, Macedonia and Epirus against Ottoman Empire	1878	1878	Epirus Revolt	1878	1878	Revolt of Valtos	1878
Revolts in Thessaly, Macedonia and Epirus against Ottoman Empire	1878	1878	Epirus Revolt	1878	1878	Revolt of Radovitsi	1878
Revolts in Thessaly, Macedonia and Epirus against Ottoman Empire	1878	1878	Epirus Revolt	1878	1878	Revolt of Arta	1878
Revolts in Thessaly, Macedonia and Epirus against Ottoman Empire	1878	1878	Epirus Revolt	1878	1878	Battle of Lykoursi	1878
Revolts in Thessaly, Macedonia and Epirus against Ottoman Empire	1878	1878	Thessaly Revolt	1878	1878	Battle of Kato Moni Ksenias	1878
Revolts in Thessaly, Macedonia and Epirus against Ottoman Empire	1878	1878	Thessaly Revolt	1878	1878	Battle of Palio Platano	1878
Revolts in Thessaly, Macedonia and Epirus against Ottoman Empire	1878	1878	Thessaly Revolt	1878	1878	Battle of souvria	1878
Revolts in Thessaly, Macedonia and Epirus against Ottoman Empire	1878	1878	Thessaly Revolt	1878	1878	First Battle of Makrinitsa	1878
Revolts in Thessaly, Macedonia and Epirus against Ottoman Empire	1878	1878	Thessaly Revolt	1878	1878	Second Battle of Makrinitsa	1878
Revolts in Thessaly, Macedonia and Epirus against Ottoman Empire	1878	1878	Thessaly Revolt	1878	1878	Battle of Kedros	1878
Revolts in Thessaly, Macedonia and Epirus against Ottoman Empire	1878	1878	Thessaly Revolt	1878	1878	Battle of Sekliza	1878
Revolts in Thessaly, Macedonia and Epirus against Ottoman Empire	1878	1878	Thessaly Revolt	1878	1878	Battle of Mataragka	1878
Revolts in Thessaly, Macedonia and Epirus against Ottoman Empire	1878	1878	Thessaly Revolt	1878	1878	Battle of Mouzaki	1878
Revolts in Thessaly, Macedonia and Epirus against Ottoman Empire	1878	1878	Macedonian Revolt	1878	1878		
Cretan Revolt against the Ottoman Empire	1885	1885					
Cretan Revolt against the Ottoman Empire	1889	1889					
Cretan Revolt (1897–1898)	1897	1898				Battle of Leivadia	1897
Greco-Turkish War	1897	1897				Battle of Farsala	1897
Greco-Turkish War	1897	1897				Battle of Velestino	1897
Greco-Turkish War	1897	1897				Battle of Domokos	1897

=== 20th century ===
==== 1900–1938 ====
( * ) Greece officially entered World War I in 1917.

War	Start of the war	Finish of the war	Name of conflict	Start of the conflict	Finish of the conflict	Part	Start	Finish	Battle	Year of Battle
Macedonian Struggle	1904	1908								
Theriso revolt	1905	1905								
Balkan Wars	1912	1913	First Balkan War	1912	1913	Greek front	1912	1913	Battle of Elassona	1912
Balkan Wars	1912	1913	First Balkan War	1912	1913	Greek front	1912	1913	Battle of Sarantaporo	1912
Balkan Wars	1912	1913	First Balkan War	1912	1913	Greek front	1912	1913	Invasion of Imbros	1912
Balkan Wars	1912	1913	First Balkan War	1912	1913	Greek front	1912	1913	Battle of Yenidje	1912
Balkan Wars	1912	1913	First Balkan War	1912	1913	Greek front	1912	1913	Battle of Pente Pigadia	1912
Balkan Wars	1912	1913	First Balkan War	1912	1913	Greek front	1912	1913	Battle of Sorovich	1912
Balkan Wars	1912	1913	First Balkan War	1912	1913	Greek front	1912	1913	Himara revolt	1912
Balkan Wars	1912	1913	First Balkan War	1912	1913	Greek front	1912	1913	Battle of Lesbos	1912
Balkan Wars	1912	1913	First Balkan War	1912	1913	Greek front	1912	1913	Battle of Chios	1912
Balkan Wars	1912	1913	First Balkan War	1912	1913	Greek front	1912	1913	Battle of Elli	1912
Balkan Wars	1912	1913	First Balkan War	1912	1913	Greek front	1912	1913	Battle of Korytsa	1912
Balkan Wars	1912	1913	First Balkan War	1912	1913	Greek front	1912	1913	Battle of Lemnos	1913
Balkan Wars	1912	1913	First Balkan War	1912	1913	Greek front	1912	1913	Battle of Bizani	1913
Balkan Wars	1912	1913	Second Balkan War	1913	1913				Battle of Angitis	
Balkan Wars	1912	1913	Second Balkan War	1913	1913				Battle of Kilkis–Lahanas	1913
Balkan Wars	1912	1913	Second Balkan War	1913	1913				Battle of Doiran	1913
Balkan Wars	1912	1913	Second Balkan War	1913	1913				Battle of Demir Hisar	1913
Balkan Wars	1912	1913	Second Balkan War	1913	1913				Battle of Kresna Gorge	1913
Icarian revolution against the Ottoman Empire	1912	1912								
World War I (Greece in World War I) *	1914	1918	Mediterranean Theatre	1914	1918				Battle of Imbros	1918
World War I (Greece in World War I) *	1914	1918	Balkans Campaign / Macedonian front	1914	1918				Battle of Skra-di-Legen	1918
World War I (Greece in World War I) *	1914	1918	Balkans Campaign / Macedonian front	1914	1918	Vardar offensive	1918	1918	Battle of Dobro Pole	1918
World War I (Greece in World War I) *	1914	1918	Balkans Campaign / Macedonian front	1914	1918	Vardar offensive	1918	1918	Battle of Doiran	1918
Allied intervention in the Russian Civil War	1918	1920								
Greco-Turkish War	1919	1922							Greek landing at Smyrna	1919
Greco-Turkish War	1919	1922							Battle of Tellidede	1919
Greco-Turkish War	1919	1922							Battle of Aydın	1919
Greco-Turkish War	1919	1922				Greek Summer Offensive	1920	1920		
Greco-Turkish War	1919	1922							Battle of the Gediz	1920
Greco-Turkish War	1919	1922							First Battle of İnönü	1921
Greco-Turkish War	1919	1922							Second Battle of İnönü	1921
Greco-Turkish War	1919	1922							Battle of Kütahya–Eskişehir	1921
Greco-Turkish War	1919	1922							Battle of Sakarya	1921
Greco-Turkish War	1919	1922				Great Offensive	1922	1922	Battle of Dumlupınar	1922
Greco-Turkish War	1919	1922				Great Offensive	1922	1922	Turkish capture of Smyrna	1922
Corfu incident	1923	1923								
Incident at Petrich	1925	1925								

==== 1939–1945 ====
( * ) Greece entered World War II in 1940.

War	Start of the war	Finish of the war	Fronts	Start	Finish	Name of conflict	Start of the conflict	Finish of the conflict	Part	Start (of "Part")	Finish (of "Part")	Part II	Year(s) (of "Part II")	Battle	Year Of Battle
World War II (Greece in World War II) *	1939	1945	European theatre	1939	1940	Western Front	1939	1945	Operation Overlord	1944	1945	Normandy landings	1944		
World War II (Greece in World War II) *	1939	1945	European theatre	1939	1940	Italian campaign	1943	1945	Allied invasion of Sicily (Operation Husky)	1943	1943				
World War II (Greece in World War II) *	1939	1945	European theatre	1939	1940	Italian campaign	1943	1945	Allied invasion of Italy	1943	1943	Winter Line	1943–1944	Battle of Anzio	1944
World War II (Greece in World War II) *	1939	1945	European theatre	1939	1940	Italian campaign	1943	1945	Allied invasion of Italy	1943	1943	Gothic Line	1944–1945	Battle of Rimini	1944
World War II (Greece in World War II) *	1939	1945	Mediterranean and Middle East theatre	1940	1945										
World War II (Greece in World War II) *	1939	1945	Mediterranean and Middle East theatre	1940	1945	Balkans Campaign	1940	1941	Greco-Italian War	1940	1941	Italian offensive	1940	Battle of Pindus	1940
World War II (Greece in World War II) *	1939	1945	Mediterranean and Middle East theatre	1940	1945	Balkans Campaign	1940	1941	Greco-Italian War	1940	1941	Italian offensive	1940	Battle of Elaia–Kalamas	1940
World War II (Greece in World War II) *	1939	1945	Mediterranean and Middle East theatre	1940	1945	Balkans Campaign	1940	1941	Greco-Italian War	1940	1941	Greek counteroffensive	1940–1941	Battle of Morava–Ivan	1940
World War II (Greece in World War II) *	1939	1945	Mediterranean and Middle East theatre	1940	1945	Balkans Campaign	1940	1941	Greco-Italian War	1940	1941	Greek counteroffensive	1940–1941	Battle of Korçë	1940
World War II (Greece in World War II) *	1939	1945	Mediterranean and Middle East theatre	1940	1945	Balkans Campaign	1940	1941	Greco-Italian War	1940	1941	Greek counteroffensive	1940–1941	Battle of Saranda	1940
World War II (Greece in World War II) *	1939	1945	Mediterranean and Middle East theatre	1940	1945	Balkans Campaign	1940	1941	Greco-Italian War	1940	1941	Greek counteroffensive	1940–1941	Battle of Himara	1940
World War II (Greece in World War II) *	1939	1945	Mediterranean and Middle East theatre	1940	1945	Balkans Campaign	1940	1941	Greco-Italian War	1940	1941	Greek counteroffensive	1940–1941	Capture of Klisura Pass	1941
World War II (Greece in World War II) *	1939	1945	Mediterranean and Middle East theatre	1940	1945	Balkans Campaign	1940	1941	Greco-Italian War	1940	1941	Greek counteroffensive	1940–1941	Battle of Trebeshina	1941
World War II (Greece in World War II) *	1939	1945	Mediterranean and Middle East theatre	1940	1945	Balkans Campaign	1940	1941	Greco-Italian War	1940	1941	Italian spring offensive (Operation Primavera)	1941	Battle of Hill 731	1941
World War II (Greece in World War II) *	1939	1945	Mediterranean and Middle East theatre	1940	1945	Balkans Campaign	1940	1941	Greco-Italian War	1940	1941	Italian second spring offensive	1941	Battle of Ponte Perati	1941
World War II (Greece in World War II) *	1939	1945	Mediterranean and Middle East theatre	1940	1945	Balkans Campaign	1940	1941	German invasion of Greece	1941	1941	Operation Marita	1941		
World War II (Greece in World War II) *	1939	1945	Mediterranean and Middle East theatre	1940	1945	Balkans Campaign	1940	1941	German invasion of Greece	1941	1941	Operation Marita	1941	Battle of Metaxas Line	1941
World War II (Greece in World War II) *	1939	1945	Mediterranean and Middle East theatre	1940	1945	Balkans Campaign	1940	1941	German invasion of Greece	1941	1941	Operation Marita	1941	Battle of Vevi	1941
World War II (Greece in World War II) *	1939	1945	Mediterranean and Middle East theatre	1940	1945	Balkans Campaign	1940	1941	German invasion of Greece	1941	1941	Operation Marita	1941	Battle of Kleisoura Pass	1941
World War II (Greece in World War II) *	1939	1945	Mediterranean and Middle East theatre	1940	1945	Balkans Campaign	1940	1941	German invasion of Greece	1941	1941	Operation Marita	1941	Battle of Thermopylae	1941
World War II (Greece in World War II) *	1939	1945	Mediterranean and Middle East theatre	1940	1945	Balkans Campaign	1940	1941	German invasion of Greece	1941	1941	Battle of Crete (Operation Mercury)	1941		
World War II (Greece in World War II) *	1939	1945	Mediterranean and Middle East theatre	1940	1945	Balkans Campaign	1940	1941	German invasion of Greece	1941	1941	Battle of Crete (Operation Mercury)	1941	Battle of Maleme	1941
World War II (Greece in World War II) *	1939	1945	Mediterranean and Middle East theatre	1940	1945	Balkans Campaign	1940	1941	German invasion of Greece	1941	1941	Battle of Crete (Operation Mercury)	1941	Battle of Rethymno	1941
World War II (Greece in World War II) *	1939	1945	Mediterranean and Middle East theatre	1940	1945	Balkans Campaign	1940	1941	German invasion of Greece	1941	1941	Battle of Crete (Operation Mercury)	1941	Battle of Heraklion	1941
World War II (Greece in World War II) *	1939	1945	Mediterranean and Middle East theatre	1940	1945	North African Campaign	1940	1943	Western Desert Campaign	1940	1943			Second Battle of El Alamein	1942
World War II (Greece in World War II) *	1939	1945	Mediterranean and Middle East theatre	1940	1945	North African Campaign	1940	1943	Tunisia Campaign	1942	1943			Battle of Ksar Ghilane	1943
World War II (Greece in World War II) *	1939	1945	Mediterranean and Middle East theatre	1940	1945	North African Campaign	1940	1943	Tunisia Campaign	1942	1943			Battle of Wadi Akarit	1943
World War II (Greece in World War II) *	1939	1945	Mediterranean and Middle East theatre	1940	1945	Adriatic Campaign	1939	1945							
World War II (Greece in World War II) *	1939	1945	Mediterranean and Middle East theatre	1940	1945	Mediterranean Campaign	1940	1945	Dodecanese Campaign	1943	1943			Battle of Rhodes	1943
World War II (Greece in World War II) *	1939	1945	Mediterranean and Middle East theatre	1940	1945	Mediterranean Campaign	1940	1945	Dodecanese Campaign	1943	1943			Battle of Leros	1943
World War II (Greece in World War II) *	1939	1945	Mediterranean and Middle East theatre	1940	1945	Mediterranean Campaign	1940	1945	Dodecanese Campaign	1943	1943			Battle of Kos	1943
World War II (Greece in World War II) *	1939	1945	Mediterranean and Middle East theatre	1940	1945	Mediterranean Campaign	1940	1945						Action off Cape Bougaroun	1943
World War II (Greece in World War II) *	1939	1945	Mediterranean and Middle East theatre	1940	1945	Mediterranean Campaign	1940	1945						Raid on Santorini	1944
World War II (Greece in World War II) *	1939	1945	Mediterranean and Middle East theatre	1940	1945	Mediterranean Campaign	1940	1945						Raid on Ios	1944
World War II (Greece in World War II) *	1939	1945	Mediterranean and Middle East theatre	1940	1945	Mediterranean Campaign	1940	1945						Raid on Mykonos	1944
World War II (Greece in World War II) *	1939	1945	Mediterranean and Middle East theatre	1940	1945	Mediterranean Campaign	1940	1945						Raid on Amorgos	1944
World War II (Greece in World War II) *	1939	1945	Mediterranean and Middle East theatre	1940	1945	Mediterranean Campaign	1940	1945	Operation Tenement	1944	1944			Raid on Symi	1944
World War II (Greece in World War II) *	1939	1945	Mediterranean and Middle East theatre	1940	1945	Mediterranean Campaign	1940	1945	Operation Dragoon	1944	1944				
World War II (Greece in World War II) *	1939	1945	Mediterranean and Middle East theatre	1940	1945	Greek Resistance	1941	1944						Drama Uprising	1941
World War II (Greece in World War II) *	1939	1945	Mediterranean and Middle East theatre	1940	1945	Greek Resistance	1941	1944						ESPO bombing	1942
World War II (Greece in World War II) *	1939	1945	Mediterranean and Middle East theatre	1940	1945	Greek Resistance	1941	1944						Battle of Gorgopotamos	1942
World War II (Greece in World War II) *	1939	1945	Mediterranean and Middle East theatre	1940	1945	Greek Resistance	1941	1944						Operation Animals	1943
World War II (Greece in World War II) *	1939	1945	Mediterranean and Middle East theatre	1940	1945	Greek Resistance	1941	1944						22 July 1943 Athens protest	1943
World War II (Greece in World War II) *	1939	1945	Mediterranean and Middle East theatre	1940	1945	Greek Resistance	1941	1944						1 May 1944 Kaisariani executions	1944
World War II (Greece in World War II) *	1939	1945	Mediterranean and Middle East theatre	1940	1945	Greek Resistance	1941	1944						Battle of Kokkinia	1944
World War II (Greece in World War II) *	1939	1945	Mediterranean and Middle East theatre	1940	1945	Greek Resistance	1941	1944	Cretan resistance	1941	1945			Kidnapping of Heinrich Kreipe	1944
World War II (Greece in World War II) *	1939	1945	Mediterranean and Middle East theatre	1940	1945	Greek Resistance	1941	1944	Cretan resistance	1941	1945			Damasta sabotage	1944

==== 1946–1949 ====
There was infighting between Greeks prior to 1946, the start of the Greek civil war.

War	Start of the war	Finish of the war	Battle	Year Of Battle
Greek Civil War	1946	1949	Battle of Meligalas	1944
Greek Civil War	1946	1949	Dekemvriana	1944–1945
Greek Civil War	1946	1949	Litochoro Attack	1946
Greek Civil War	1946	1949	Battle of Konitsa	1947–1948
Greek Civil War	1946	1949	Operation Limnes	1948
Greek Civil War	1946	1949	Battle of Kalavryta	1948
Greek Civil War	1946	1949	Operation Koronis	1948
Greek Civil War	1946	1949	Battle of Karditsa	1948
Greek Civil War	1946	1949	Battle of Naousa	1949
Greek Civil War	1946	1949	Battle of Karpenisi	1949
Greek Civil War	1946	1949	Operation Peristera	1948–1949
Greek Civil War	1946	1949	Battle of Agios Vasileios	1949
Greek Civil War	1946	1949	Battle of Florina	1949
Greek Civil War	1946	1949	Operation Pyravlos	1949
Greek Civil War	1946	1949	Battle of Metaxades	1949
Greek Civil War	1946	1949	Operation Pyrsos	1949

==== 1950–1989 ====
( * ) Greece didn't participate at the battles and didn't declare war on Turkey, only some Greek units participated.

War/Mission	Start of the war/mission	Finish of the war/mission	Force	Start operating of the force	Finish operating of the force	Battle	Year Of Battle
Korean War	1950	1953	Greek Expeditionary Force in Korea (EKSE)	1950	1958	Battle of Chosin Reservoir	1950
Korean War	1950	1953	Greek Expeditionary Force in Korea (EKSE)	1950	1958	First Battle of Wonju	1951
Korean War	1950	1953	Greek Expeditionary Force in Korea (EKSE)	1950	1958	Second Battle of Wonju	1951
Korean War	1950	1953	Greek Expeditionary Force in Korea (EKSE)	1950	1958	Battle of Hill 381 in Icheon	1951
Korean War	1950	1953	Greek Expeditionary Force in Korea (EKSE)	1950	1958	Battle of Hill 326	1951
Korean War	1950	1953	Greek Expeditionary Force in Korea (EKSE)	1950	1958	Battle of Hill 313 in Yeoncheon (Scotch Hill)	1951
Korean War	1950	1953	Greek Expeditionary Force in Korea (EKSE)	1950	1958	Battle of Nori Hill	1952
Korean War	1950	1953	Greek Expeditionary Force in Korea (EKSE)	1950	1958	Sieges of Outpost Harry	1953
Korean War	1950	1953	Greek Expeditionary Force in Korea (EKSE)	1950	1958	Battle of Bukjeong Pass	1953
CONGO-UNIKOM	1960	1961	Air Task Force of Congo				
Turkish invasion of Cyprus *	1974	1974	Greek Force of Cyprus (ELDYK)	1959	Present	Battle of Paphos	1974
Turkish invasion of Cyprus *	1974	1974	Greek Force of Cyprus (ELDYK)	1959	Present	Attacks against the area of Kioneli	1974
Turkish invasion of Cyprus *	1974	1974	Greek Force of Cyprus (ELDYK)	1959	Present	Battle of the ELDYK camp	1974
Turkish invasion of Cyprus *	1974	1974	Greek Force of Cyprus (ELDYK)	1959	Present	Battle of Nicosia International Airport	1974
Turkish invasion of Cyprus *	1974	1974	Greek Force of Cyprus (ELDYK)	1959	Present	Battle of Lapithos	1974
Turkish invasion of Cyprus *	1974	1974	Greek Force of Cyprus (ELDYK)	1959	Present	Battle of Karava	1974
Turkish invasion of Cyprus *	1974	1974	Greek Force of Cyprus (ELDYK)	1959	Present	Battle of Vasilia Passage	1974
Turkish invasion of Cyprus *	1974	1974	Greek Force of Cyprus (ELDYK)	1959	Present	Battle of the English College	1974
Turkish invasion of Cyprus *	1974	1974	Greek Force of Cyprus (ELDYK)	1959	Present	Battle of the ELDYK camp	1974

==== 1990–1999 ====
( * ) If the Greek force had/have a specific name.

The Greek forces had/have mostly peacekeeping, humanitarian, logistics, reconstruction and support role

War/Mission	Start of the war/mission	Finish of the war/mission	Name of the International Force	Start operating of the force	Finish operating of the force	Name of the Greek Force *	Start operating of the force	Finish operating of the force	Operation	Start	Finish
Gulf War	1990	1991									
United Nations Iraq–Kuwait Observation Mission (UNIKOM)	1991	2003									
United Nations Guards Contingent in Iraq (UNGCI)	1991	2003									
NATO intervention in Bosnia and Herzegovina	1992	2004	Implementation Force (IFOR)	1995	1996	Greek Force in Bosnia (ELDYB)	1995	2004	Operation Joint Endeavour	1995	1996
NATO intervention in Bosnia and Herzegovina	1992	2004	Stabilisation Force (SFOR)	1996	2004	Greek Force in Bosnia (ELDYB)	1995	2004	Operation Joint Guard	1996	1998
NATO intervention in Bosnia and Herzegovina	1992	2004	Stabilisation Force (SFOR)	1996	2004	Greek Force in Bosnia (ELDYB)	1995	2004	Operation Joint Forge	1998	2004
United Nations Operation in Somalia II (UNOSOM II)	1993	1995	Unified Task Force (UNITAF)	1993	1994	Greek Task Force of Somalia (ELLASOM)	1993	1994			
Rebellion in Albania	1997	1997							Operation Kosmas	1997	1997
Rebellion in Albania	1997	1997				Greek Force in Albania (ELDAL)	1997	1997	Operation Alba	1997	1997
United Nations Organization Stabilization Mission in the Democratic Republic of the Congo (MONUSCO)	1999	2011									
Peacekeeping operation in Kosovo after Kosovo War	1999	Present	Kosovo Force (KFOR)	1999	Present	Greek Force in Kosovo (ELDYKO)	1999	2003			

=== 21st century ===
( * ) If the Greek force had/have a specific name.
( ** ) Operations started in the 20th century but continuing into the 21st century are listed in both centuries.
( *** ) ISAF was in Afghanistan from 2001–2014, but ELDAF-TESAF was from 2002-2012. Some trainers of the Hellenic Air Force who are training Afghanese pilots stayed there longer than the ELDAF-TESAF. RSM was in Afghanistan from 2015-2021.
( **** ) The Greek Forces in Afghanistan was named ELDAF until 2005 and later they renamed to TESAF.
( ***** ) The Maritime Task Force (MTF) is the naval component of the United Nations Interim Force in Lebanon (UNIFIL)

The Greek forces had/have mostly peacekeeping, humanitarian, logistics, reconstruction and support role.

War/ Mission	Start of the war/mission	Finish of the war/mission	Name of the International Force	Start operating of the force	Finish operating of the force	Name of the Greek Force *	Start operating of the force	Finish operating of the force	Operation	Start	Finish	Outcome
United Nations Iraq–Kuwait Observation Mission (UNIKOM) **	1991	2003										Victory
United Nations Guards Contingent in Iraq (UNGCI) **	1991	2003										Victory
NATO intervention in Bosnia and Herzegovina **	1992	2004	Stabilisation Force (SFOR)	1996	2004	Greek Force in Bosnia (ELDYB)	1995	2004	Operation Joint Forge	1998	2004	Victory
United Nations Organization Stabilization Mission in the Democratic Republic of the Congo (MONUSCO) **	1999	2011							Operation Artemis	2003	2003	Victory
Peacekeeping operation in Kosovo after Kosovo War **	1999	Present	Kosovo Force (KFOR)	1999	Present	Greek Force in Kosovo (ELDYKO)	1999	2003				Ongoing
Peacekeeping operation in Kosovo after Kosovo War **	1999	Present	Kosovo Force (KFOR)	1999	Present	Greek Force in Kosovo-2 (ELDYKO-2)	2003	2011				Ongoing
Peacekeeping operation in Kosovo after Kosovo War **	1999	Present	Kosovo Force (KFOR)	1999	Present	Greek Force in Kosovo-3 (ELDYKO-3)	2011	Present				Ongoing
Insurgency in North Macedonia and missions in North Macedonia	2001	2003				Greek Force in Skopje (ELDYS)	2001	2003	Operation Essential Harvest	2001	2001	Victory: Macedonian government agrees to give greater political rights to Macedonian Albanians following the ceasefire
Insurgency in North Macedonia and missions in North Macedonia	2001	2003				Greek Force in Skopje (ELDYS)	2001	2003	Operation Amber Fox	2001	2002	Victory: Macedonian government agrees to give greater political rights to Macedonian Albanians following the ceasefire
Insurgency in North Macedonia and missions in North Macedonia	2001	2003				Greek Force in Skopje (ELDYS)	2001	2003	Operation Allied Harmony	2002	2003	Victory: Macedonian government agrees to give greater political rights to Macedonian Albanians following the ceasefire
Insurgency in North Macedonia and missions in North Macedonia	2001	2003				Greek Force in Skopje (ELDYS)	2001	2003	Operation Concordia	2003	2003	Victory: Macedonian government agrees to give greater political rights to Macedonian Albanians following the ceasefire
War in Afghanistan	2001	2021	International Security Assistance Force (ISAF), Resolute Support Mission (RSM) ***	2001	2021	Greek Force in Afghanistan (ELDAF) *** / ****	2002	2005				Defeat: Return of the Islamic Emirate of Afghanistan in 2021
War in Afghanistan	2001	2021	International Security Assistance Force (ISAF), Resolute Support Mission (RSM) ***	2001	2021	Special Composition Battalion in Afghanistan (TESAF) *** / ****	2005	2012				Defeat: Return of the Islamic Emirate of Afghanistan in 2021
Operation Active Endeavour	2001	2016	Standing Naval Force Mediterranean (STANAVFORMED or SNFM)	1992	2004							Victory
Operation Active Endeavour	2001	2016	Standing NATO Maritime Group 2 (SNMG2)	2005	2016							Victory
Operation Enduring Freedom – Horn of Africa	2002	Present	Standing NATO Maritime Group 2 (SNMG2)	2005	Present				Operation Ocean Shield	2009	2016	Ongoing
United Nations Mission in Sudan (UNMIS)	2005	2011										Victory
Missions in Lebanon	2006	Present	Maritime Task Force (MTF) *****	2006	Present							Ongoing
Military intervention in Libya	2011	2011							Operation Unified Protector	2011	2011	Victory
American-led intervention in Iraq against ISIS	2014	present										Ongoing
Operation Irini	2020	present										Ongoing
Operation Prosperity Guardian	2023	present										Ongoing
Operation Aspides	2023	present										Ongoing
2026 Iran war (Defensive operations in Cyprus and Saudi Arabia)	2026	present										Ongoing

== See also ==
- List of Greco-Persian Wars
