= Battle of Kleisova =

1825 battle of the Greek War of Independence

- Part of the Greek War of Independence
Date	25 March 1826
Location	Kleisova, Missolonghi, Aetolia-Acarnania, Rumelia Eyalet, Ottoman Empire
Result	Greek victory

Belligerents
Greek revolutionaries	Ottoman Empire

Commanders and leaders
Kitsos Tzavelas; Panos Sotiropoulos; Kitsos Paschos †	Kütahı; Ibrahim Pasha

Strength
130	

Casualties and losses
60	3,500

The Battle of Kleisova was a military event of the Greek Revolution of 1821 that took place in 1825 on the islet of Kleisova in the Lagoon of Missolonghi.

In December 1825, the Turks, led by Kütahı, besieged Missolonghi without much success, then Ibrahim arrived and took over as leader of the operation without result.

In order to make the conquest of Missolonghi easier, Kleisova, a small island located one mile southeast of Missolonghi, had to be occupied in order to cut off the city's supply. The islet was guarded by 130 men, all from the Missolonghi garrison.

Kütahı, in order to surprise Kleisova so that he could conquer it more easily, decided to make a diversion. He pretended to attack Missolonghi, but he abruptly changed course and turned towards Kleisova. Then the chieftain of Soulio, Kitsos Tzavelas, launched a daring raid: he left Missolonghi with eight men, crossed the enemy fleet and reached the island with his boats, sharing almost certain death with all its defenders. He was determined for everything and proved it in every way in the hours that followed.

Kütahı made six unsuccessful attacks, having lost a lot of his army, he was forced to retreat. Kütahı himself participated in the last attack to encourage his warriors, but was wounded in the leg and forced to withdraw from the conflict. The departure of the Turkish commander caused panic among his soldiers and they began to retreat. According to estimates, more than 1,500 Turks were killed or wounded.

After Kütahı unsuccessful attempt, Ibrahim took over and attacked Kleisova with a large army. Ibrahim had three battalions consisting of 3,000 men led by his son-in-law Hussein Bey. On 25 March/6 April, Kitsos Tzavelas and Panagiotis Sotiropoulos repelled an Albanian attack on the small island of Kleisova with heavy losses. The same forces put 500 Egyptians out of action, who, under pressure from Ibrahim, who was determined to prove that his men were better than Kütahı, attempted three times to capture the island without success. The Egyptian ships circled the island and the soldiers rushed against the only fortress of the Holy Trinity.

Kitsos Tzavelas, however, had planned to strike when the enemy felt very sure that he had come close. Hussein made five successive assaults without any result. The Greek shots were so accurate that the fighters had become emboldened. Thus they massacred everyone they approached. When the sea was filled with corpses, Hussein stood up in his boat to encourage his soldiers. However, he did not have time to give new orders because Sotiropoulos spotted him, shot him and threw him dead. The death of Ibrahim's son-in-law destroyed any trace of discipline that was left in his men. A heroic raid by the Greek guard led by Tzavelas followed, who pursued the opponents into the lagoon and exterminated them en masse.

The Turks attacked the Greeks six times without success. 131 Greek fighters successfully defended a 300-meter islet against two armies with a total strength of 6,000 men. They repelled 11 consecutive attacks and wrote history. The battle of Kleisova may have been won by the Greeks, but this did not change the fate of Missolonghi.

== Sources ==
- Christopoulos, Georgios A. & Bastias, Ioannis K., eds. (1970–2000). Ιστορία του Ελληνικού Έθνους [History of the Greek Nation] (in Greek). Vol. 1–16. Athens: Ekdotiki Athinon. p. 12.
- Dakin,D. Ο αγώνας των Ελλήνων για την ανεξαρτησία 1821-1833 , μτφρ. Ρ. Σταυρίδη-Πατρικίου 2η έκδοση, ΜΙΕΤ, Αθήνα, 1989
