= Battle of Agios Vasileios =

Battle of the Greek Civil War (1949)

Coordinates: 37°11′13.55″N 22°41′21.02″E

- Part of Greek Civil War
Date	22 January 1949
Location	Agios Vasileios, Arcadia, Greece
Result	National Army victory

Belligerents
Provisional Democratic Government; Democratic Army of Greece; People's Civil Guard	Kingdom of Greece; National Army

Commanders and leaders
(Greece) Alekos Tsoukopoulos (Greece) Panos Kontogiannis	(Greece) Periklis Papathanasiou (Greece) Psarrakis

Strength
240	900–1,200

Casualties and losses
70–181 killed 60–78 captured	30 killed or wounded 7 captured
- Location of the battle in Greece

The Battle of Agios Vasileios (Greek: Μάχη στον Άγιο Βασίλειο) took place on 22 January 1949. It was fought during the course of Operation Peristera as part of the Greek Civil War, pitting forces of the communist Democratic Army of Greece (DSE) led by Alekos Tsoukopoulos against the nationalist government army under Periklis Papathanasiou.

In the early morning hours of 22 January, nationalist Mountain Raider squadrons launched an attack on the village of Agios Vasileios. The DSE troops resting in the village were caught by surprise due to a combination of poor security measures and exhaustion. The ensuing confusion and the numerical superiority of the nationalists led to heavy casualties among the communists. The Raiders were able to safely withdraw from the area before the defenders received reinforcements. Tsoukopoulos was subsequently convicted by a military tribunal and executed by for his role in the defeat at Agios Vasileios. The Battle of Agios Vasileios dealt a severe blow to DSE's Peloponnese Division, hastening its complete disintegration by the end of 1949.

== Background ==
In the aftermath of the Axis occupation of Greece, tensions arose between the Communist Party of Greece-backed EAM-ELAS resistance movement and the Greek government in exile. The rivalry between the British-backed government and EAM-ELAS resulted in the Dekemvriana clashes in Athens (December 1944 – January 1945). EAM-ELAS was defeated and had to accept its disarmament in the Treaty of Varkiza (February 1945). The disarmament of EAM-ELAS fighters facilitated the persecution of its supporters by various right-wing paramilitary bands. Greek leftists established self-defense militias, known as Groups of Democratic Armed Persecuted Fighters (ODEKA). The Communist Party of Greece began preparations for an armed confrontation with the Greek government in April 1946. By the end of the year, the communist party had established a rival government known as the Provisional Democratic Government, with the Democratic Army of Greece (DSE) acting as its army; while the conflict escalated into the Greek Civil War.

At the end of 1948, DSE controlled all of the Peloponnese peninsula's main mountain ranges, including Taygetus, Parnon and Mainalo. Its morale was high due to a series of victories against the government forces, and its strength had been brought to 4,870 combatants through a conscription drive that was held between October and November 1948. The head of the American military advisory mission, Lieutenant General James Van Fleet, pressured the Greek government into initiating large scale counter-insurgency operations since he feared that the United States Congress would not approve further military aid for Greece beyond the summer of 1949. In the eyes of the Greek government, the Peloponnese branch of the DSE was the weakest, since it was physically isolated from Greece's northern Eastern Bloc neighbors, and could only be supplied by sea. Between 1 December 1948 and February 1949, nationalist army troops thwarted three DSE supply attempts, bringing its ammunition shortage to a critical point. The region's proximity to the Greek capital, Athens, also necessitated its pacification for political reasons.

Operation Peristera ('Dove') was planned by Lieutenant General Dimitrios Giantzis. It envisioned the transfer of 12,000 soldiers and gendarmes from central and northern Greece, bringing the total strength of the government forces in the Peloponnese to 44,000 men. Government troops would then conduct clearance operations along the Corinth-Patras-Pyrgos axis by utilizing its road and railroad infrastructure. By launching the operation from the north of Peloponnese in a southern direction, the nationalist army would prevent any possible reinforcements arriving from Central Greece. It was also argued that conquest of the more densely populated areas of the peninsula would put pressure on DSE's sympathizers in the south to switch sides. The nationalist army sought to apply the concept of total war, by depriving the rebels of their support base. This was to be achieved through a combination of mass arrests and the extrajudicial killing of communist sleeper agents and supporters among the civilian population. The operation was to be executed by the I Army Corps, commanded by Lieutenant General Thrasyvoulos Tsakalotos, along with auxiliary units of the Royal Gendarmerie, National Guard and the MAY, rural militia units recruited from nationalist civilians.

On the night of 24/25 December 1948, government authorities arrested approximately 4,500 civilians in areas under their control, most of whom were politically neutral. Those detained were accused of sympathizing with the communists and deported to the Trikeri and Makronisos concentration camps. The wave of arrests was conducted in combination with strict censorship and the establishment of numerous checkpoints that severely restricted trade and mobility in the peninsula. Those measures instilled fear into DSE's supporters, many of whom ceased providing the rebels with information and black market supplies. The counter-insurgency operation was launched on 27 December, with the Gulf of Corinth, the plains of Achaea and the mountain foothills in the northern littoral being the first to be targeted. The DSE responded by attempting to sabotage the region's transport infrastructure, but the absence of necessary tools meant the effort did not succeed. The DSE high command decided to engage in delaying battles across the entire northern front in order to exhaust the nationalist army. The communists would allow the nationalists to reach the Ladon River valley, whereupon they would penetrate into the rear lines of their adversaries. The communists planned to attack the nationalists' supply lines and elude the bulk of the government troops by moving into mountainous terrain. While the communists had successfully applied similar elusive maneuvers in the past, their efforts fell short in 1949 due to several factors. Heavy snowfall blocked many mountain paths, making the communists' movements more predictable. The nationalists had refined their patrol tactics and employed a large number of armed civilians, further limiting DSE's mobility. In the north of the peninsula, DSE units fell victim to numerous ambushes, suffering heavy losses.

== Prelude ==
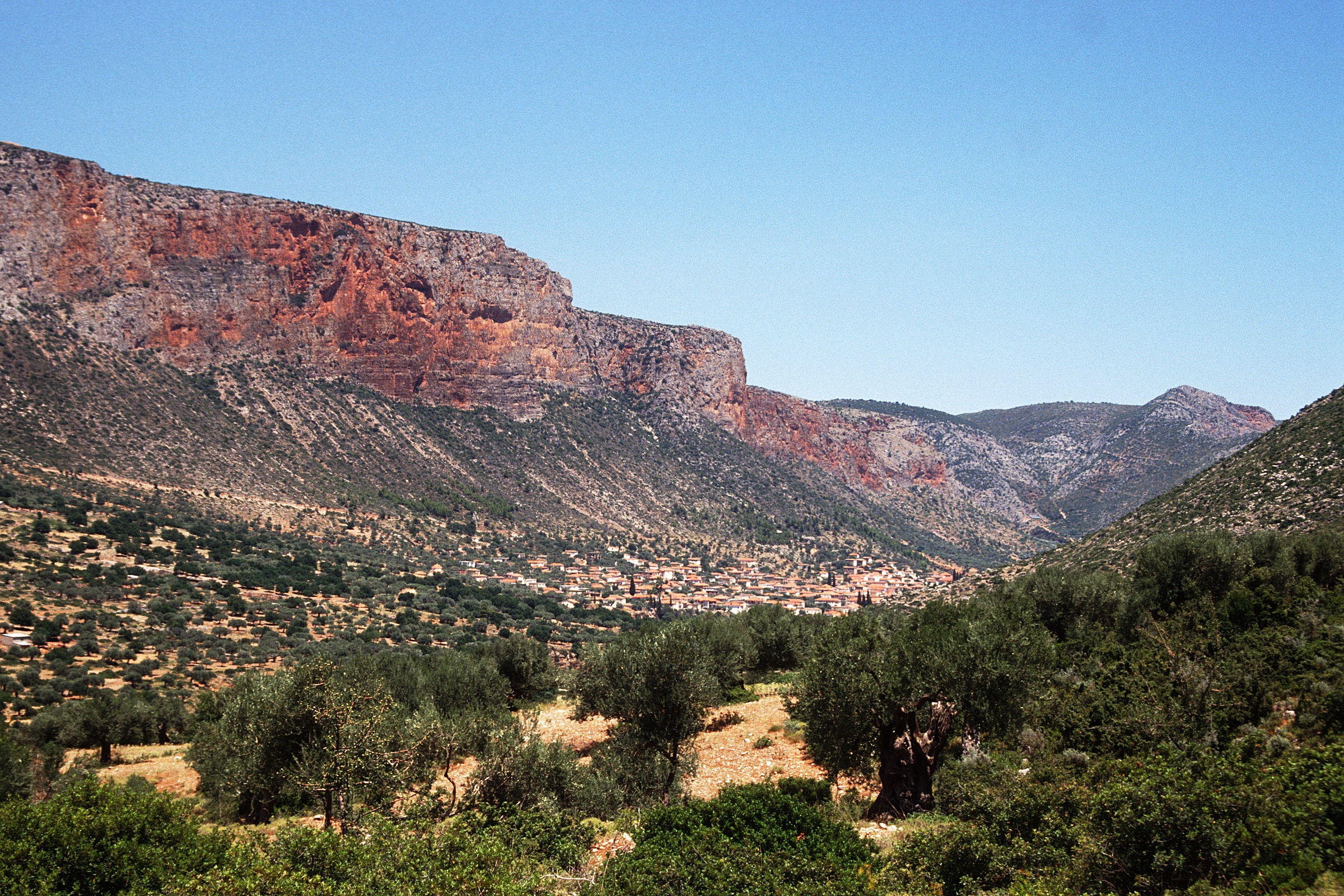
Leonidio in 1993

On 19 January 1949, DSE ordered its 55th Brigade to assault the eastern coastal town of Leonidio in a diversionary attack. Its location outside the axis of the nationalist offensive and the large stockpiles of food and military equipment within the town made it an attractive target for the communists. The rebels were hoping that the attack on Leonidio combined with the recent fall of Karpenisi in central Greece would provide their units in northern Peloponnese some respite. The Battle of Leonidio began on the night of 20/21 January. The rebels advanced barefoot, but the element of surprise was lost when they were spotted by government sentries. Heavy fighting lasted for five hours, until the Mylos Manolaki fortified position, which was the crux of the nationalist defensive line, was targeted by two Panzerfaust missiles. The defenders withdrew towards the town's port, while receiving covering fire from the warships Pindos and Symi. A few minutes after DSE fighters entered into Leonidio, the commander of the 55th Brigade, Theodoros Prekezes, ordered all units to withdraw from the town immediately. Prekezes had previously received a phone call informing him that 1,000 soldiers of the Mountain Raider squadrons had departed Sparta for Mount Parnon's Vamvakou peak, in an effort to encircle his force. The communists had expended large amounts of ammunition in the battle and were forced to hurriedly abandon the town without looting its warehouses. The outcome of the Battle of Leonidio further exacerbated the DSE's ammunition shortage at a point when it was facing unprecedented pressure.

After the conclusion of the battle, the 55th Brigade needed to reorganize itself and provide rest, medical attention and hot food to its soldiers. This could only be accomplished in populated villages, despite the risks such a maneuver could entail. Its 1st and 2nd battalions established themselves in the Platanaki and Palaiochori villages. Alekos Tsoukopoulos’ battalion moved to the Pigadi Chioni locale west of the Agios Vasileios village, where it set up bonfires in a fir forest. At approximately 22:00 on 21 January a messenger arrived at Pigadi Chioni from Palaiochori carrying an order from Prekezes. After hearing it, Tsoukopoulos informed his soldiers that they were to spend the night at Agios Vasileios. Prekezes gave the order after receiving a phone call from DSE's Western Parnon call center, whose operators had been captured by nationalist soldiers and then forced to transmit misleading information. At the time Agios Vasileios housed the DSE Parnon Command's political structure, logistics and medical units. Owing to its remote location it was considered safe and guarded by a small People's Civil Guard unit. Tsoukopoulos’ battalion arrived at Agios Vasileios one and a half hours later where most of its soldiers were assigned on guard duty. The 3rd and 4th Raider Squadrons, commanded by Periklis Papathanasiou and Psarrakis respectively, were carrying out operations in Parnon during the course of the Battle of Leonidio. After capturing the communist telephone operators, the Raiders numbering some 900-1200 men encircled Agios Vasileios aiming to ambush their adversaries after most of them had fallen asleep. The total number of DSE fighters in the village was approximately 240. Owing to exhaustion the communists had failed to take the necessary steps to secure the village's perimeter. The Raiders managed to learn the passwords used by the DSE soldiers on guard duty.

== Operation ==
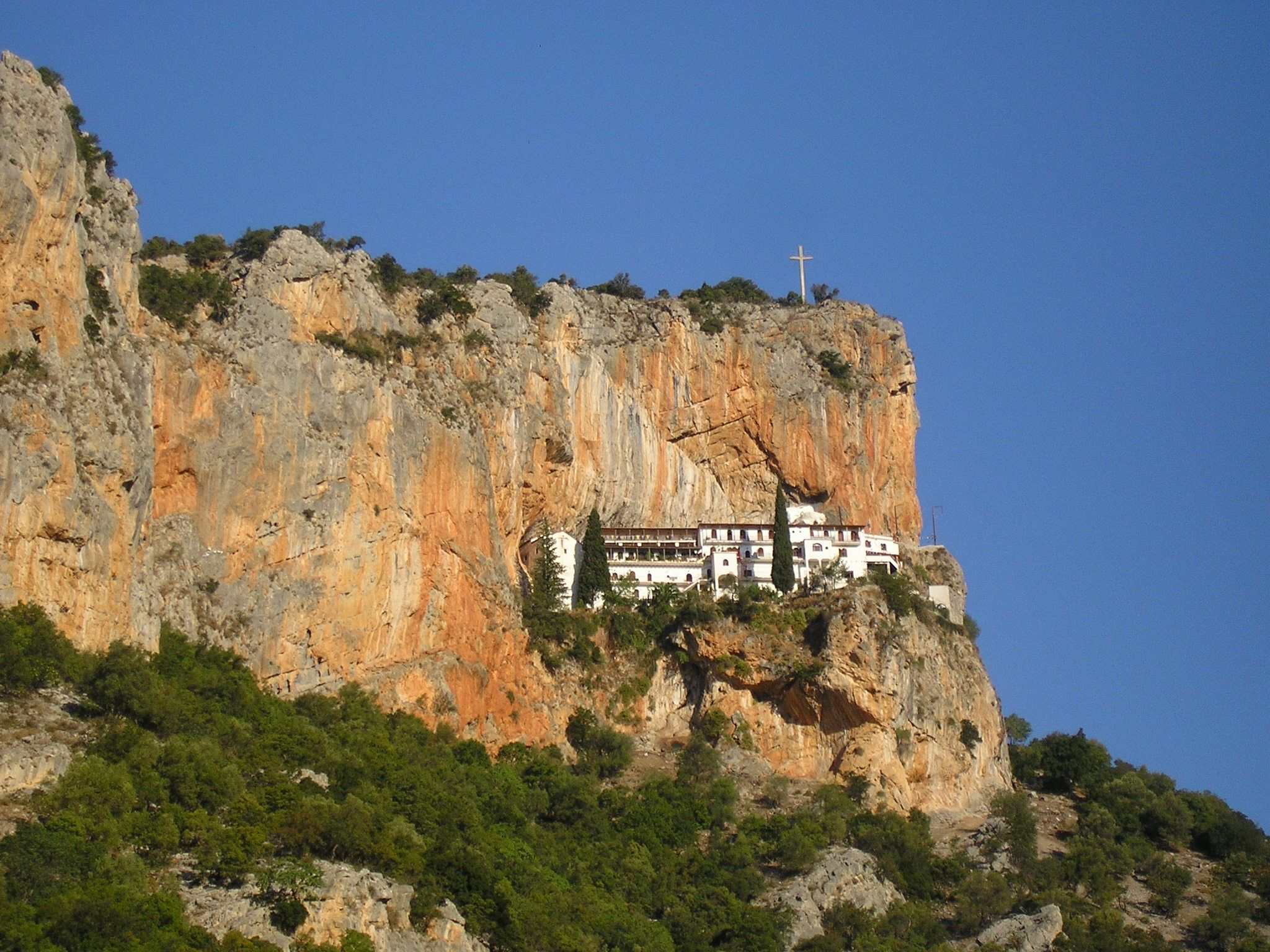
Elonas Monastery

Just before sunrise on 22 January 1949, the nationalist troops attacked Agios Vasileios from multiple directions. Tsoukopoulos gathered his officers in the village square, informing them that they had been encircled. At the time Tsoukopoulos was unaware that the road leading to the village from the north-east towards Pigadi and the Toumpano height was open. Tsoukopoulos tasked his company commanders with finding breakthrough points independently, from various directions. Panagiotis Skagos' company was to seize the Toumpano height; Dimitrios Koutroulakis' company was dispatched to the school and the houses overlooking the road to Platanaki; Konstantinos Papakonstantinou led his company towards the Achlada height. Before Koutroulakis was able to carry out his part of the plan, he was informed that nationalist soldiers had already ambushed his company causing heavy casualties. The Raiders had hidden inside a lone house on the outskirts of the village which was supposed to have been secured by Koutroulakis's men during the night. Koutroulakis and Papakonstantinou agreed to join their forces in attacking the Platanaki road. A wave of panicking civilians fleeing the fighting mixed in with the two units, causing a delay in their deployment. Upon reaching the edge of the village the two companies encountered heavy fire and decided to counter-attack in the direction of Achlada.

Papakonstantinou's men reached the edge of the forest without encountering any resistance, as the enemy machine guns continued to fire on the village. Koutroulakis was initially following behind but then suddenly ordered his soldiers to fall back to the village. Some of Papakonstantinou's soldiers became confused and also went back to the village. Koutroulakis' company and stragglers from other units, some 80 people in total, encountered a force of approximately 500 raiders. The two sides engaged in sanguinary close-quarters combat, before all of the communists were either killed or captured. The reason behind Koutroulakis' decision to turn back remains unknown since he was killed in action.

A DSE machine gun platoon at the village's graveyard overlooked an exposed, snow covered plain; this platoon easily suppressed a nationalist attempt to block the road to Pigadi. Tsoukopoulos mistook the machine gun rattle originating from the graveyard for nationalist fire. Tsoukopoulos led a platoon in a counter-attack on the Kastanitsa road in the north-western part of the village, the counter-attack failed and Tsoukopoulos returned to the village square. It was only at that point that he realized that the road to Pigadi was open, he forwarded his platoon to the graveyard and sent staff officer Giorgis Sampanis to gather the defenders remaining in the village and lead them to the north-east. Tsoukopoulos then took up a position on Toumpano and began firing on the Raiders entering the village, later utilizing the machine gun that had been transferred from the graveyard. Sampanis and political officer Dimitris Kottis were attempting to gather panicking civilians and military personnel across the village when they came face to face with nationalist commandos and were killed in the subsequent exchange of fire.

Papakonstantinou's company advanced through the forest before securing Achlada and the nearby heights. The nationalists briefly skirmished with the defenders of Achlada but soon abandoned any attempts to capture it due to its steep terrain and low visibility. When the commander of the 55th Brigade realized what had happened, he moved his troops towards the roads the Raiders were most likely to use in their withdrawal, namely the roads towards Pigadi and the Elonas monastery. Prekezes suspected that Agios Vasileios had been attacked due to the sounds of gunfire coming from its direction, however he was unable to immediately deploy his troops since he lacked critical information about the situation on the ground.

Tsoukopoulos had dispatched a messenger, having forgotten about the availability of a working phone. As it began to dawn, communist reinforcements began to arrive in Agios Vasileios, attacking the rear and the south-eastern flank of their adversaries from the direction of Platanaki. Taken by surprise by the attack and realizing that he was threatened with encirclement, Raider commander Psarrakis ignored direct orders and commanded an immediate withdrawal from the area. The Raiders managed to occupy the Koumarias height east of the village, and began to retreat towards Leonidio and Astros, murdering captured prisoners who could not follow their pace. They were pursued by a force of two companies and two platoons, before a blizzard enabled them to reach safety. The surviving DSE fighters reoccupied Agios Vasileios.

== Aftermath ==
According to a nationalist army report, DSE lost 181 men killed and 78 captured; the report made no distinction between rebel fighters and leftist civilians. Other estimates lowered DSE casualties to 135 killed (35 murdered after being captured), or 70-80 killed and 60 captured. Nationalist casualties amounted to 30 killed and wounded and 7 captured. On 24 January, the 55th Brigade was reorganized into six double companies and Tsoukopoulos was relieved from his command and placed at the disposal of the brigade. Several days later, DSE formed a commission to investigate the reasons behind the defeat at Agios Vasileios. The preliminary investigation identified the battalion's company commanders, political officer Panos Kontogiannis, and battalion commander Tsoukopoulos as responsible. Tsoukopoulos assumed full responsibility for the outcome of the battle and thus the investigations concerning the company commanders were halted. On 2 February, Tsoukopoulos and Kontogiannis stood trial in front of a military tribunal that took place in the village square of Agios Vasileios. The tribunal unanimously sentenced Tsoukopoulos and Kontogiannis to death, the latter's sentence was suspended for five years after he admitted guilt and asked for clemency. Tsoukopoulos was executed the following day. The heavy toll of the battle and Tsoukopoulos' execution caused the morale of the Peloponnesian DSE fighters to plunge, loosening their discipline. Some DSE personnel including Papakonstantinou argued that the trial did not follow due process and Tsoukopoulos was scapegoated in the name of maintaining discipline.

Between 27 and 28 January, DSE's Achaea Command fell into a series of ambushes losing 80 killed and 78 wounded. On 9 February, the last big formation of DSE in the north of the peninsula (150 soldiers) was defeated in battle. The remnants of the unit wandered around the countryside as either lone soldiers or small groups losing their cohesion. Most of the troops belonging to the Parnon Command began its march to the north of the peninsula on 28 February. The rebels suffered from hunger and frostbite, and were regularly harried by armed peasants and the nationalist military. Many DSE soldiers opted to commit suicide rather than surrender, as the nationalists began employing more brutal extrajudicial killing methods such as immolation. Papakonstantinou's company was the only one from Parnon to reach its target destination, uniting with the Peloponnese Division's headquarters in the Kapeli forest. On 7 March, the last remaining DSE battalion on Parnon was destroyed. On 14 March, the main DSE force on Peloponnese was defeated at Drakovouni, the surviving guerrillas jumped into the Ladon River. The last organized DSE units held out in Taygetus, small in number and lacking information about the progress of the war elsewhere they later became an easy target for government counter-insurgency operations. The DSE in the Peloponnese had been destroyed and most of the communist holdouts had been killed by the end of 1949.

== Sources ==
- Kamarinos, Aristos (2015). Ο εμφύλιος πόλεμος στη Πελοπόννησο 1946-1949 [The Civil War in the Peloponnese (1946-1949)] (in Greek). Athens: Synchroni Epochi. ISBN 9789602248720.
- Margaritis, Giorgos (2006). Ιστορία του ελληνικού εμφυλίου πολέμου 1946-1949 [History of the Greek Civil War 1946-1949] (in Greek). Vol. II. Athens: Vivliorama. ISBN 9608087139.
- Papakonstantinou, Konstantinos (2002). Η νεκρή Μεραρχία [The dead Division] (in Greek). Vol. II. Athens: Alfeios.
- Rajak, Svetoslav (2010). "The Cold War in the Balkans, 1945–1956". In Leffler, Melvyn P.; Westad, Odd Arne (eds.). The Cambridge History of the Cold War, Volume I. Cambridge University Press. pp. 198–220. ISBN 978-0521837194.
- Stouras, Panagiotis (2016). The Greek Civil War in the Aegialia and Kalavrita Area (1946-1949) (PhD thesis) (in Greek). University of Johannesburg. pp. 1–513.
