= Siege of Tripoli (999) =

- Part of Arab–Byzantine wars
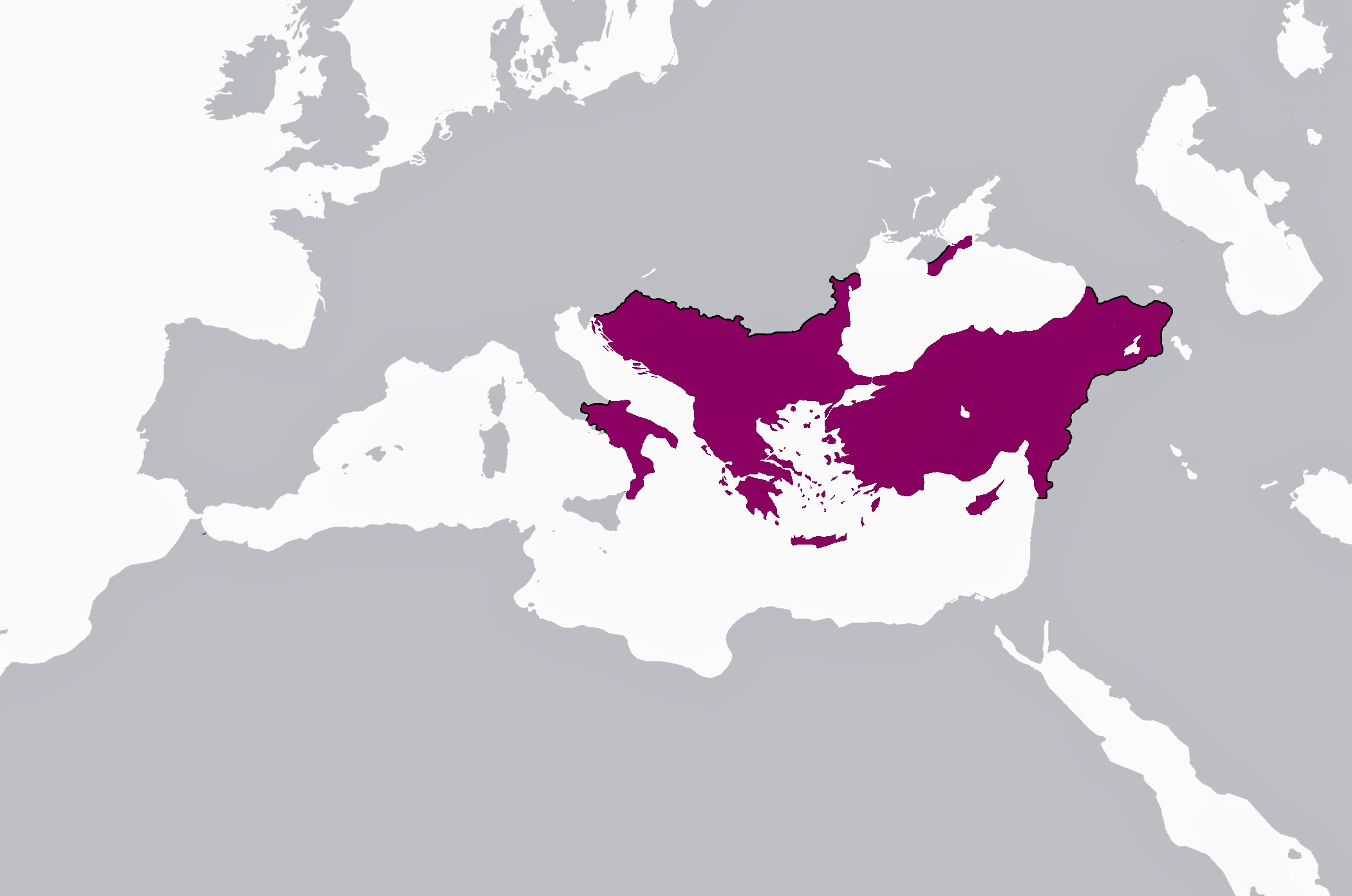
- Map of the Byzantine Empire during the reign of Emperor Basil II in 1025
Date	September – December 999
Location	Tripoli, Levant
Result	Fatimid victory

Belligerents
Byzantine Empire	Fatimid Caliphate

Commanders and leaders
Basil II	Hakim bi-Amr Allah

The Siege of Tripoli in December 999 was a strategic military campaign led by Byzantine Emperor Basil II. It was designed to curb the growing power of the Fatimid Caliphate and re-establish Byzantine authority across the Levant.

== Background ==
The Fatimid Caliphate focused heavily on conquering and fully controlling Aleppo, launching major military campaigns between 990 and 999. Coordinating with local rulers from Levantine cities like Tripoli, Damascus, Tyre, and Beirut, they advanced toward Byzantine-ruled Antioch.

These escalating conflicts led to a fierce battle on July 19, 998, resulting in the death of the Byzantine governor of Antioch Damian Dalassenos. In response to this heavy blow, Emperor Basil II personally led his army back into Syria in September 999, launching a powerful punitive campaign against the Fatimids.

== The siege ==
In the autumn of 999, Basil II swept through northern Syria like a storm. He seized Shaizar, left the famous churches of Homs in ashes, and tore down the coastal fortress of Arqa, leaving a trail of destruction all the way to the gates of Tripoli.

On a late Tuesday, Basil’s grand army surrounded the city. Within three days, his men had dug deep trenches to fortify their camp and cut off the main water canal feeding the Tripoli] fortress, leaving the defenders desperate. Just as tension reached its peak, two Byzantine warships arrived by sea, packed with fresh food and supplies that energized the troops. With their bellies full and spirits high, Basil’s forces launched a fierce, direct assault against the fortress walls.

But the Emperor was as cunning as he was ruthless. While the main battle raged at Tripoli, he sent a secret unit down the coast to raid Beirut and Byblos. This shadow force captured scores of locals, loaded them onto the very ships that had brought the army's food, and sent them across the sea into exile a dark, calculated victory.

== Aftermath ==
Despite his ruthless tactics, Basil II’s assault on Tripoli ultimately proved half-hearted and inconclusive. The city's defenses held firm, and failing to capture the strategic port, the Emperor finally abandoned the effort. On December 22, 999, he lifted the siege and marched his army away toward Latakia and Antioch. Tripoli remained free a proud, independent city managed by its own Muslim judges and governors, still loyal to the Fatimid Caliphate.

Yet, the campaign was far from a total loss. It served as a stark warning, proving to the Fatimids that the Byzantines could strike deep into Syria whenever they pleased. This newfound respect paved the way for diplomacy. With the Patriarch of Jerusalem stepping in as a mediator, the two empires chose peace over endless bloodshed. In 1001, Emperor Basil II and the Fatimid Caliph Al-Hakim bi-Amr Allah signed a landmark ten year truce, finally bringing stability to the region.
