= Battle of Metaxades =

1949 battle

- Part of Greek Civil War
Location
Result
Metaxades
Greek Army Victory
- Refuge of remnants of the Democratic Army units in Bulgaria

Belligerents
Hellenic Army	Democratic Army of Greece

Commanders and leaders
Georgios Vlassis; Ilias Lalos	Vaggelis Kasapis; Nikos Kanakaridis

Strength
2 officers and 32 men	1,378 or about 800 fighters

Casualties and losses
2 officers and 11 other ranks killed 62 injured 6 missing 5 injured and 3 missing men of MEA 4 men and 7 women were abducted from Metaxades.	According to army figures, 173 dead and 108 captured or surrendered guerrillas.

The Battle of Metaxades was a part of the Greek Civil War and took place in the village of Metaxades, Evros from 15 to 20 May 1949, between the Greek Army and the Democratic Army of Greece in the area between the two hills of the village. This battle was the last attempt of the Democratic Army to operate outside the fortified groups in Grammos and Vitsi. It was the biggest and bloodiest battle in the prefecture of Evros.

== Battle ==
One week before May 15, 1949, the area surrounding Metaxades was occupied by the guerrillas and as a result, the inhabitants of the villages of Paliouri, Polia, Avdella and Alepochori had settled in Metaxades. The soldiers knew about the guerrilla attack and did not let the farmers go to their fields.

The attack began on Sunday, May 15. When the attack commenced, all the civilians in Metaxades hid in strongholds hidden in the ground which could hold 15 to 20 people each. Metaxades hill was guarded by Greek Army soldiers when the attack began. For twenty-four hours the guerrillas repeatedly attempted to occupy the hill but the army and the civilians hiding on the hill successfully repulsed them. The army was in possession of mortars and machine guns which gave them a significant material advantage over the guerrillas, who had a small supply of low-power mortars that could not be used due to lack of training. The hill was under siege by the guerrillas and was resupplied by air drop.

The military continued to defend the hill over the next two days. Due to the ongoing siege a call for reinforcement was sent. Two regiments travelled from the Protokklisi military base to Metaxades and attempted to reach the hill. The siege was breached on May 17 and the reinforcements crossed a minefield to reach the hill. On May 18, several airstrikes occurred which resulted in the death and surrender of most guerrillas.
