= Battle of Amida (972) =

- Part of Arab–Byzantine wars
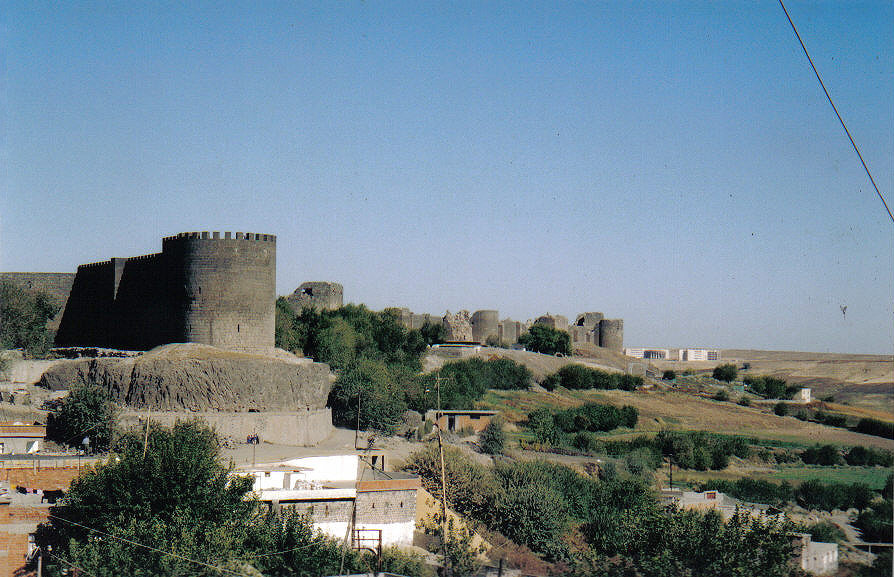
- Amida city walls
Date	972
Location	Amida, modern Diyarbakir
Result	Hamdanid victory

Belligerents
Byzantine Empire	Hamdanid dynasty

Commanders and leaders
Melias The Armenian (POW)	Abu Taghlib; Hibat al-Dawla

Strength
50,000	Unknown

Casualties and losses
~50,000 killed or Captured; Execution of 40 commanders	Low/light

The Battle of Amida took place in 972 between the forces of the Byzantine Empire, led by the Domesticus Mleh (Malias), and the Hamdanid Dynasty, led by Hiba Allah bin Nasir al-Dawla, the brother of Abu Taghlib. Despite initial Byzantine successes in Northern Mesopotamia, the battle resulted in a catastrophic Byzantine defeat, the capture of their commander, and the imprisonment of forty high-ranking princes.

== Background ==
In 973, the Byzantine military commander known as the Domestic Melias led a formidable force of approximately 50,000 troops toward the city of Amida on the Tigris River. The campaign began with a decisive Byzantine advantage; the imperial forces engaged local Muslim troops commanded by Hibat Allah bin Nasir al-Dawla outside the city walls. Following their defeat in the field, the local defenders were forced to retreat and seek refuge within the fortifications of the city. The Byzantine army subsequently established a camp in the vicinity, preparing to launch a formal siege.

== Battle ==
The momentum of the engagement shifted abruptly due to a violent and sudden dust storm. The weather conditions reportedly blinded the Byzantine soldiers and caused significant logistical devastation, as equipment was swept into the Tigris and the camp fell into total disarray.

Contemporary Armenian chroniclers interpreted the event as a manifestation of divine wrath. Observing the paralysis of the Byzantine ranks, the Muslim forces launched a massive counter-offensive. The imperial army was effectively annihilated only a small fraction of the force managed to escape.

== Aftermath ==
The battle resulted in a significant tactical disaster for the Byzantine Empire. The Domestic Melias was captured during the rout, along with forty high-ranking Byzantine nobles and officers.

== See also ==
- Battle of the Orontes
- Siege of Aleppo (994–995)
- Battle of Marash (953)
