= Operation Limnes =

Conflict of the Greek Civil War

Coordinates: 40°38′25″N 22°56′8″E

Date	February 10, 1948–February 13, 1948
Location	Thessaloniki, Macedonia
Result	National Army victory

Belligerents
(Greece) Provisional Democratic Government: Democratic Army	Kingdom of Greece: National Army

Commanders and leaders
(Greece) Markos Vafeiadis	(Greece) Alexander Papagos
- Location of the attack in Greece

Operation Limnes (Greek: Επιχείρηση «Λίμνες», "Lakes") was a plan drawn up by the Communist Party of Greece during the Greek Civil War to set up a Free Greece in Macedonia and Thrace. The operation, drawn up with support from Yugoslavia, was built around the capture of Thessaloniki, which was to become the capital of the new state. Developed in April 1947, it was publicly announced in Paris, France in June that year. It was expected that support would come from the Soviet Union and other Communist countries, who would supply material for an army, navy and air force. Although the leader of the Soviet Union, Joseph Stalin, gave his support, the large amount of equipment did not arrive. In consequence, the only action of the operation, an assault on Thessaloniki in February 1948, relied on a limited amount of mortars and artillery, Most of the attackers were killed or captured.

== Description ==
The creation of a Free Greece was discussed at the plenum of the Communist Party of Greece in April 11 to 12, 1947. A plan was drawn up, titled Operation Limnes, meaning 'Lakes'. The central part of the plan was the creation of a "Free Greece" in Macedonia and Thrace. "Free Greece" was to be an autonomous communist state. The plan was adopted at the meeting. The strategy depended on the creation of a large army, which was to be supported by an air force and navy. It envisaged achieving this, initially, with 60,000 troops. This included 10,000 recruited from Muslim communities in Eastern Macedonia and Western Thrace.

The plan was written in Russian. This enabled it to be read internationally; it was envisaged as part of the wider set of Communist revolution that the Greek Communists expected in the immediate post-war period. It was designed with assistance from Yugoslavia. However, the Greeks expected support to also come from the Soviet Union and its allies, particularly in the form of weapons, heavy artillery, warplanes and naval vessels. On May 20, Nikos Zachariadis, the leader of the Communist Party travelled to Moscow and met the Soviet leader Joseph Stalin. Stalin not only authorised the launch of a civil war but also gave permission for the other communist countries in the Balkans to offer support. However, substantial support was not forthcoming, mainly due to a change in direction in the Soviet hierarchy, who wanted to focus away from encouraging revolution to other methods of spreading Communism.

Nonetheless, at the congress of the French Communist Party between 25 and 28 June, the plan was announced publicly by a delegate of the Communist Party of Greece. The reaction from the rest of the delegates was mixed. This was followed, in December, by a radio announcement in Greece on the formation of a “Provisional Democratic Government” led by Markos Vafeiadis.

== Attack on Thessaloniki ==
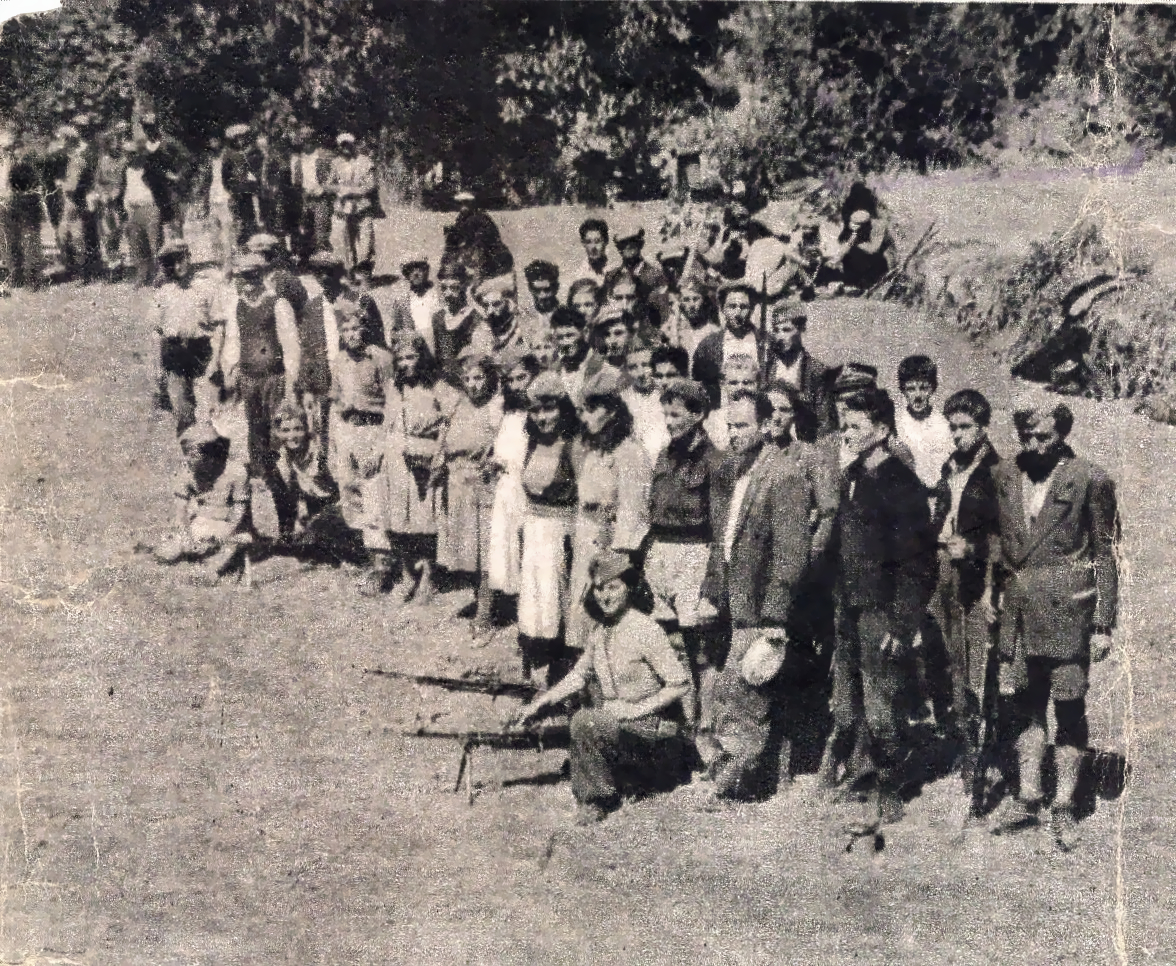
Fighters of the Democratic Army of Greece

A fundamental part of Operation Limnes was the identification of Thessaloniki as the capital city of the new state. This meant that the capture of this city was one of the main objectives for the plan. In preparation, the Democratic Army of Greece, the army of the Communist party launched a series of increasingly large attacks on government outposts in the area. After casualties on both sides, they either withdrew or were beaten back, returning to their bases in areas of the country already under their control.

On February 10, 1948, the Democratic Army felt able to finally take Thessaloniki and fighters launched a night attack, firing mortars and artillery from the hills that stood on the outskirts of the city. Rather than completing the attack, confusion reigned amongst the attackers. The attackers, estimated by the Greek authorities at numbering in their thousands, were repulsed. The Greek National Army then pursued and captured or killed most of them. In the words of historian John O. Iatrides, "Operation Limnes was thus stillborn".
