= Fall of Great Preslav (971) =

- Part of the Byzantine–Bulgarian Wars
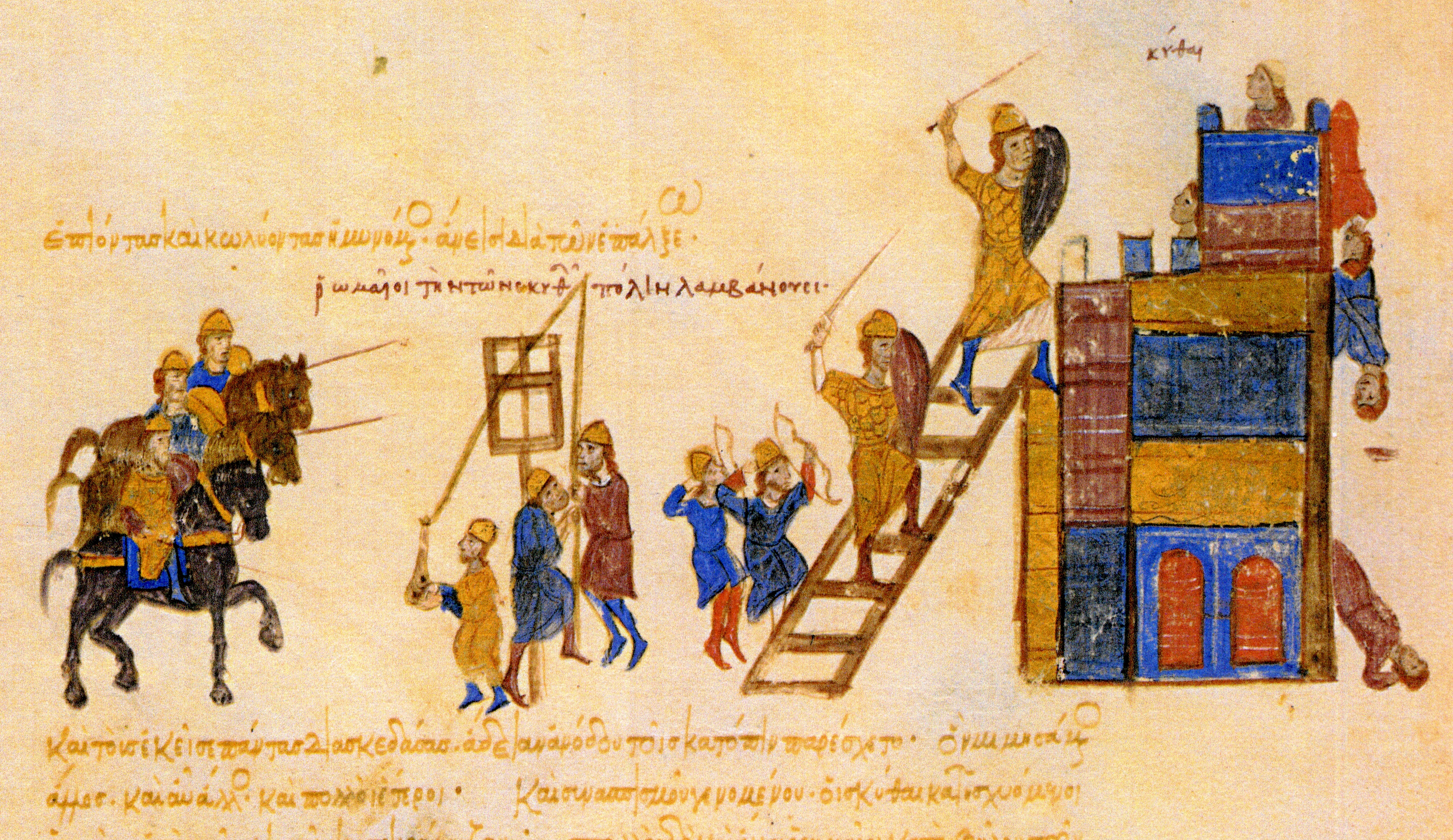
- The Byzantines conquer Preslav, depicted in John Skylitzes' illustrated text
Date	12–13 April 971
Location	Preslav, Bulgaria
Result	Byzantine victory

Belligerents
Byzantine Empire	Tsardom of Bulgaria; Kievan Rus

Commanders and leaders
John I Tzimiskes; Bardas Skleros; Proedros Basil; Theodosios Mesonyktes	Boris II of Bulgaria (POW); Sphengel; Kalokyres

Strength
Battle of Great Preslav: 9,000; Siege of Great preslav: 30,000	Battle of Great Preslav: More than the Byzantines; Siege of Great preslav: Large Garrison

Casualties and losses
Unknown	8,500 killed in the Battle; Most of the Garrison

The Fall of Great Preslav to the Byzantines occurred during the war in Bulgaria between the armies of Emperor John I Tzimiskes and the combined Bulgarian and Kievan Rus' forces in 971. The Byzantines crushed a Bulgarian-Rus' army in a pitched battle outside the Bulgarian capital Great Preslav, and on the following day assaulted the city. The Byzantines stormed both the lower city and the citadel on 13 April, killing most of the defending garrison and taking captive the royal family of Bulgaria. Great Preslav was sacked before being rebuilt and garrisoned by the Byzantines, marking the beginning of a Byzantine occupation in Eastern Bulgaria.

== Background ==
In the year 970, the Byzantines, under the command of Bardas Skleros, had won a major victory at the Battle of Arcadiopolis against a Rus'-led coalition that had invaded Thrace, under the leadership of Prince Sviatoslav I. This defeat forced Sviatoslav and his armies to withdraw into the territories of Bulgaria in order to reorganise. The incumbent Byzantine Emperor John Tzimiskes spent the remainder of 970 consolidating his rule, after which he prepared an offensive in order to exploit Skleros' victory, aimed at driving the Rus' out of Bulgaria. By spring 971, he had mustered a considerable army, but entering the Bulgarian heartland required a crossing of the Haemus mountains, the site of several disastrous Byzantine defeats during Bulgarian ambushes in the past. Although Tzimiskes' cabinet of staff advised him to advance methodically and dispatch scouting parties to extensively survey the terrain and detect possible ambushes, the emperor gambled on a swift advance to catch the Bulgarians by surprise. He detached a picked force of 9,000 men (5,000 infantry and 4,000 cavalry) from his main army and pressed towards the Haemus. Tzimiskes' calculation proved correct as Sviatoslav, who had assumed the Byzantines would not begin any campaigns until the celebration of Easter had passed, failed to adequately fortify or garrison the mountain passes. Consequently, the emperor and his elite advance forces were able to march through the Haemus with minimal resistance, before descending into the plains of Eastern Bulgaria. The rest of the army, under Proedros Basil, followed at a slower pace, over a day behind John's column.

== Battle and siege ==
=== Battle of Great Preslav ===
Having crossed the Haemus, John I slowed down his march and gave his men a period of rest, encamping them on a hill with rivers flowing on both sides, so that troops and horses could be watered. After staying the night, the Byzantines advanced towards the capital of the Bulgarian Empire, Great Preslav. Outside the city, the Byzantines found a Bulgarian-Rus' army already in the field conducting training exercises. Although these men were fully armed, Tzimiskes' advance had caught them in operational surprise, forcing the Bulgarian soldiers (most of whom were infantry) to hastily form into battle order. John Tzimiskes arrayed his men in dense formations and ordered the advance, sounding trumpets, cymbals and drums as his men pushed forward. The Byzantines met the Bulgarians and Rus' in a fierce battle, in which both sides were evenly matched at first. The engagement was decided when the emperor directed his elite Athanatoi to charge the left flank of the Bulgarian line. The lance attacks of these cataphracts proved too powerful for the Bulgarians to resist, and their line shattered under the pressure. By this time, Rus' forces inside Preslav had observed the developments and, hastily arming themselves, sallied out to reinforce their comrades. However, their rushed advance from Preslav was disorderly and caused their lines to spread out, with the result being that the pursuing Byzantine cavalry routed them with ease. The Byzantines pursued their enemy vigorously, and one cavalry unit managed to cut off the route of retreat for the Bulgar-Rus' forces. The result was the annihilation of a large portion of the enemy force, with some 8,500 Bulgarsians and Rus slaughtered outside Preslav, according to Leo the Deacon.

=== Siege of Great Preslav ===
Following the Byzantine victory outside Great Preslav, Kalokyres, a Byzantine turncoat in Rus' service residing in the city, left Preslav in order to carry word of the emperor's sudden advance to Sviatoslav, who resided with his main army near Dorostolon. John Tzimiskes had struck camp for the night to rest his men and await the arrival of the rest of his field army, which had followed a day behind the 9,000-strong advance force. Kalokyres was consequently able to evade capture and reach Sviatoslav. The following day, Thursday 13th, Tzimiskes was joined by the remainder of his men under Basil, reuniting his army into a force up to 30,000 strong. Exploiting his strategic momentum, Tzimiskes quickly organised his army into tight formations and launched an assault against Preslav. Despite their crushing defeat the previous day, the Bulgarian-Rus' forces inside Preslav remained considerable and were emboldened by the presence of a high-ranking general called Sphengel. The garrison resisted tenaciously throwing missiles from their battlements, yet the volume of fire from Byzantine archers and artillery pieces (including Greek fire throwers) efficiently suppressed the defenders and forced them to hide behind their crenelations. Tzimiskes then sent his infantry to storm the city with scaling ladders, encouraging his men forwards with promises of rewards and honours. Leo the Deacon emphasizes the bravery of one Byzantine soldier, Theodosios Mesonyktes, who was first to scale the walls and managed to strike down a number of enemies. Theodosius was quickly reinforced by his comrades who established a bridgehead and ultimately drove the Bulgarian-Rus' forces from the outer walls. At the same time, Byzantine troops smashed through a gate of Preslav with battering rams and rushed through the breach, slaughtering anyone in their path and forcing the remaining defenders to retreat to the citadel in which the royal palace of Great Preslav was situated. During the looting which followed, the Byzantines captured Tsar Boris II, along with his wife and children, who were taken to Emperor John.

As the Byzantines spread through to sack the city, a contingent pressed on towards the royal palace. The defenders had left a gate to the citadel open through and the Byzantines pursued them, but once inside they were attacked and repulsed by the garrison, losing 150 soldiers. When John Tzimiskes learned of this setback, he rallied his troops to attack the citadel, but the Rus' and Bulgarians repulsed these assaults too. Unwilling to waste further lives in storming attempts, the emperor ordered his men to set fire to the citadel. As the conflagration spread to the buildings inside, the defending Rus' and Bulgarians were flushed out into the open. Sphengel gathered his last defenders together into a cohesive body, 7,000 - 8,000 strong, and made a final stand against the Byzantines. The Bulgarian-Rus' forces fought bravely in the streets of the citadel, prompting John Tzimiskes to send forth an elite unit under Bardas Skleros to stem the enemy counterattack. Skleros and his men managed to outflank the Bulgarian-Rus' force and occupy a position behind them, from which they fired arrows toward their opponents' rear. Most of the remaining defenders were killed in this maneuvre, though Sphengel and a group of followers managed to cut their way through and escape the city, fleeing to join Sviatoslav at Dorostolon. After two days of fighting, Great Preslav thus fell to the Byzantines.

== Aftermath ==
With Great Preslav in Byzantine hands, John Tzimiskes remained there for a period, tasking his army with rebuilding and refortifying it. He detached part of his army to garrison the city and deposited sufficient supplies for them to maintain the occupation. The royal Bulgarian captives, Boris II and his family, were dispatched under guard to Constantinople. John also celebrated the Easter holiday at Great Preslav, and after Easter Sunday he renamed the city to 'Ioannoupolis' in his honour. Then, on Monday 17th April, John and his army departed to continue their campaign. The final objective of the campaign was Dorostolon, where the emperor's army would go on to decisively defeat the main Rus' army under Sviatoslav and triumphantly conclude the war in Bulgaria.

== Bibliography ==
- Gilmer, James (2012). Lazarus Rising: Nikephoros Phokas and the Tenth Century Byzantine Military Rennaissance. Charles Town, West Virginia.
- Stephenson, Paul (2008). Byzantium's Balkan Frontier: A Political Study of the Northern Balkans, 900-1204. Cambridge University Press. ISBN 978-0190253226.
- Haldon, John (2008). The Byzantine Wars. The History Press. ISBN 978-0-7524-4565-6.
- Kaldellis, Anthony (2017). Streams of Gold, Rivers of Blood: The Rise and Fall of Byzantium, 955 A.D. to the First Crusade. Oxford University Press. ISBN 978-0190253226.
- Talbot, Alice-Mary; Sullivan, Denis F. (2005). The History of Leo the Deacon: Byzantine Military Expansion in the Tenth Century. Washington, District of Columbia: Dumbarton Oaks. ISBN 978-0-88402-324-1.
- Halsey, Eric (2025). State builders from the Steppe - a history of the first Bulgarian Empire. This is Rethink LTD. ISBN 978-619-7814-12-5.
- Wortley, John, ed. (2010). John Skylitzes: A Synopsis of Byzantine History, 811–1057. Cambridge: Cambridge University Press. ISBN 978-0-521-76705-7.
