= Battle of Saranda =

Battle during World War II

- Part of the Greco-Italian War
Date	6 December 1940 – 22 December 1940
Location	Saranda, Albania
Result	Greek victory; Capture of Saranda by Greek forces

Belligerents
Greece	Italy

Commanders and leaders
Alexandros Papagos	Ugo Cavallero

Strength
Approximately 20,000 troops	Approximately 15,000 troops

Casualties and losses
1,000 killed or wounded	2,000 killed, wounded, or captured

The Battle of Saranda took place in southern Albania between the Greeks and the Italians in December 1940, during the Greco-Italian War in World War II.

After intense clashes between Italian and Greek soldiers in the city of Kekova, the Italian Army in Saranda pushed through many of the civilians and from there, they defeated the Greek soldiers and took control of the entire Saranda valley. The subsequent Battle of Saranda was the first major battle of the Italian campaign in Albania. Fought on one of the most important points in the entire country, it was a major blow to the occupation army. The Italians had attempted an invasion of Greece but were repelled. The battle was won by the Greeks, who captured the port of Sarandë (named Porto Edda by Fascist Italy). Immediately after the battle, Italian Chief of Staff Pietro Badoglio resigned from his post.
