= List of battles before 301 =

== Before 500 BC ==
Year	Battle	Loc.	Description
c. 11,600 BC	Jebel Sahaba	(Sudan)	Qadan culture groups battle and raid against each others for resources in Jebel sabaha area South of what is now Egypt and north of Sudan
c. 8000 BC	Nataruk	(Kenya)	site in Kenya points towards conflict between hunter-gatherer group.
c. 6000 BC	Iberian Archer battles	(Spain)	Iberian cave art from the late Mesolithic and early Neolithic periods shows explicit scenes of battle between groups of archers.
c. 5300 BC	Els Trocs cave Massacre	(Spain)	The site shows signs of a battle between two groups , the victims were Neolithic migrants from a farming community , The attackers could have been indigenous hunter-gatherers.
c. 5000 BC	Attack on Talheim	(Germany)	Local forces defeated by attackers in modern-day Germany
c. 5000 BC	Massacre of Schletz	(Austria)	More than 200 Neolithic people were killed by blunt force around the same time as the massacre at Talheim, before being dumped in a mass grave on the site of present-day Schletz, Austria
c. 5000 BC	Massacre of Kilianstädten	(Germany)	Around the same time as the massacre at Talheim, at least 26 Neolithic people were killed by blunt force and arrow wounds. Their bodies were buried in a mass grave at Kilianstädten.
c. 3320 BC	Battle of Naqada	(Egypt)	King Scorpion I of Thinis defeats and kills King Bull of Naqada, uniting Upper Egypt
c. 3200 BC	Invasion of Maadi	(Egypt)	Naqada attacked the Maadi-Buto culture and invaded Maadi, Maadian culture were vacated giving way to the Naqada III
c. 3100 BC	Unification Battle of Egypt "Narmer Palette Battle"	(Egypt)	King Narmer of Upper Egypt defeats Lower Egypt in battle and founds the First Dynasty of Egypt
c. 2600 BC	Siege of Aratta	(Iran) ?	King Enmerkar of Uruk defeats the king of Aratta in modern-day Armenia and forces the kingdom into submission
c. 2580 BC	Siege of Uruk	(Iraq)	Uruk led by their King Gilgamesh and their General Enkidu, repel a siege by Aga of Kish and his allies from Isin and Nippur, capturing the Kings of Isin and Nippur
c. 2450 BC	Battle of Umma	(Iraq)	Lagash decisively defeats Umma and makes it a tributary state
c. 2334 BC	Battle of Uruk	(Iraq)	Sargon of Akkad defeats the Sumerian force led by Lugal-Zage-Si at Uruk
c. 2300 BC	Battle of Terqa	(Syria)	Ebla, allied with Nagar, Kish, and the Ib'al end the Third Mari-Ebla War by decisively defeating the Kingdom of Mari in Northeast Syria
c. 2004 BC	Sack of Ur	(Iraq)	Elam sacks Ur and thus ends the Third Dynasty of Ur
c. 1923 BC	Siege of Ur	(Iraq)	King Gungunum of Larsa captures Ur from Isin
c. 1809 BC	Siege of Assur	(Iraq)	Shamshi-Adad I of the Kingdom of Upper Mesopotamia conquers Assur
c. 1801 BC	Sack of Uruk	(Iraq)	Rim-Sin I of Larsa conquers and sacks Uruk, but spares the inhabitants
c. 1796 BC	Siege of Mari	(Syria)	Shamshi-Adad I of the Kingdom of Upper Mesopotamia conquers Mari
c. 1792 BC	Sack of Isin	(Iraq)	Rim-Sin I of Larsa conquers and sacks Isin
c. 1780 BC	Siege of Qabra	(Iraq)	Shamshi-Adad I of the Kingdom of Upper Mesopotamia and Dadusha of Eshnunna defeat and annex the city of Qabra
c. 1764 BC	Siege of Hiritum	(Iraq)	King Hammurabi of Babylonia allied with Mari defeats Elamite invasion
c. 1763 BC	Siege of Larsa	(Iraq)	Hammurabi defeats his former ally Rim-Sin I and conquers the city-state of Larsa for Babylonia
c. 1595 BC	Sack of Babylon	(Iraq)	Hittites sack Babylon and end the First Babylonian dynasty, leaving the area to be occupied by their Kassite allies for centuries
c. 1552 BC	Battle of Nefrusy	(Egypt)	Kamose forces reached Nefrusy, a detachment of Kamose's Medjay troops attacked the Hyksos garrison and overran it
c. 1550 BC	Siege of Avaris	(Egypt)	Egyptians under Ahmose I expel the Hyksos from Egypt after taking their capital of Avaris
c. 1530 BC	Siege of Sharuhen	(Israel) or (Palestine)	Egyptians under Ahmose I siege and raze town of Sharuhen in southern Canaan, the last stronghold the Hyksos fled to after he expelled them from Egypt
c. 1504 BC	Siege of Kerma	(Sudan)	Egyptians under Thutmose I conquer Kerma culture in Nubia
c. 1457 BC	Battle of Megiddo	(Israel)	Egyptian forces, led by Thutmose III, rout the Canaanite forces under the King of Kadesh
c. 14th century BC	Battle of the Ten Kings	(Pakistan) or (India)	Indo-Aryan tribal king Sudas defeats the invading Ten Kings in the Punjab region of the Indian subcontinent
c. 1319 BC	Battle of the Astarpa	(Turkey)	Hittite forces, led by Mursili II, destroy the Arzawa army under Piyama-Kurunta, son of their king Uhha-Ziti. Mursili destroys Milawanda and besieges Apasa as a result, forcing the king to retreat to Ahhiyawa along with his sons.
c. 1312 BC	Battle of Ganuvara	(Turkey)	Hittites defeat the Hayasa-Azzi confederation
c. 1332 BC	Battle of Sugagu	(Iraq)	Kurigalzu II of Kassite Babylon fights the armies of Adad-nirari I to a disputed result
c. 1300 BC	Battle at Gibeah	(Palestine)	Biblical battle between the Israelite Tribe of Benjamin and the other tribes of Israel, regarding the death of a concubine
c. 1280 BC	Battle of Kār Ištar	(Iraq)	Assyrians defeat Babylonians
c. 1278 BC	Ramesses II's Battle against Sherden pirates	(Turkey)	Egyptians under Ramesses II defeat Sherden pirates
c. 1275 BC – c. 1205 BC	Battles of Alashiya	(Cyprus)	Hittite navy and army defeat the navy and army of the Kingdom of Alashiya in modern-day Cyprus. One of the first naval battles ever recorded.
c. 1274 BC	Battle of Kadesh	(Syria) and (Lebanon)	King Muwatalli II of the Hittites surprises Ramesses II; the battle ends in a draw
c. 1269 BC	Siege of Dapur	(Syria)	Egyptian forces, led by Ramesses II, conquer Dapur
c. 1250 BC	Battle of the Tollense	(Germany)	The largest excavated battle site of this age anywhere in the world, fought between unknown polities
c. 1237 BC	Battle of Nihriya	(Turkey)	Tukulti-Ninurta I of Assyria defeats Tudḫaliya IV of the Hittites
c. 1225 BC	Sack of Babylon	(Iraq)	Tukulti-Ninurta I sacks and captures Babylon
c. 1208 BC	Battle of Perire	(Egypt)	Egypt defeats Libyan and Sea People coalition
c. 1184 BC	Siege of Troy	(Turkey)	Greeks led by Mycenae sack Troy in Northwestern Anatolia, ending 10 year Trojan War
c. 1178 BC	Battle of Djahy	(Lebanon)	Major land battle where Pharaoh Ramesses III defeats the Sea Peoples who were attempting to invade and conquer Egypt
c. 1175 BC	Battle of the Delta	(Egypt)	Egypt under Ramesses III repels a major naval invasion by the Sea Peoples
c. 1150 BC	Battle of Mount Tabor	(Israel)	Israelites led by Barak and Deborah defeat Caananites led by the King of Hazor
c. 1122 BC	Battle of the River Ulaya	(Iran)	Nebuchadnezzar I of Babylon routs the Elamites under Hutelutush-Inshushinak
c. 1046 BC	Battle of Muye	(China)	Decisive victory of the Zhou dynasty against the Shang dynasty
c. 1025 BC	Battle of Michmash	(Palestine)	Israelites defeat Philistines
c. 1010 BC	Battle of Mount Gilboa	(Israel)	The Israelites fight against the Philistines; King Saul and his son Jonathan die.
c. 1010 BC	Siege of Jebus	(Palestine)	King David of Israel takes the city of Jebus, later known as Jerusalem, from the Jebusites. It becomes the Israelite capital city.
c. 993 BC	Siege of Rabbah	(Jordan)	King David takes the capital of the Ammonites, subjugating them to Israel.
925 BC	Battle of Bitter Lakes	(Egypt)	Shoshenq I of Egypt defeats a Bedouin incursion after surprising the enemy at the shores of the Bitter Lakes.
925 BC	Sack of Jerusalem	(Palestine)	The Egyptians capture and plunder the Israelite capital of Jerusalem.
913 BC	Battle of Mount Zemaraim	(Palestine)	Judah under King Abijah defeats Israel under King Jeroboam I; 500,000 Israelites fall in a single battle.
878 BC	Battle of Suru	(Iraq)	Assyrian king Ashurnasirpal II takes the fortress of Suru from the Babylonians.
858 BC	Sack of Sugunia	(Turkey) or (Iran)	Assyrians under Shalmaneser III sack the city of Sugunia of the Urartian .
854 BC	Sack of Araškun	(Turkey) or (Iran)	Assyrians under Shalmaneser III sack the city of Araškun the Urartian capital forcing them to change their capital.
853 BC	Battle of Karkar	(Syria)	Assyrian Shalmaneser III faces a military alliance of the king of Damascus and 11 other rulers including Israel.
814 BC	Battle of Dur-Papsukkal	(Iraq) or (Iran)	Assyrian king Shamshi-Adad IV razes the Babylonian city, then defeats the army of their king Marduk-balassu-iqbi.
797 BC	Battle of Tai-yuan	(China)	Xirong defeat Zhou dynasty.
796 BC	Siege of Damascus	(Syria)	Assyrian king Adad-nirari III sieges and captures the Aramean capital of Damascus under Ben-Hadad III.
771 BC	Battle of Mount Li	(China)	Quanrong barbarians decisively defeat the Zhou, severely weakening the dynasty
c. 750 BC	Battle of the Lacus Curtius	(Italy)	The newly formed Roman Kingdom under King Romulus defeats the Sabines.
743–740 BC	Siege of Arpad	(Syria)	Assyrian king Tiglath-Pileser III takes and razes the Aramean-Syrian capital of Arpad after besieging it for three years.
743 BC	Battle of Kummuh	(Turkey)	Assyrian King Tiglath-Pileser III defeats King Sarduri I of Urartu who was attempting to relieve Arpad, taking hold of northern Syria.
733 BC	Siege of Gezer	(Israel)	The Assyrian king, Tiglath-Pileser III takes Gazru (Gezer) from the Kingdom of Israel.
724-720 BC	Siege of Tyre	(Lebanon)	Assyrians under Shalmaneser V and later Sargon II lay siege to the Phoenecian city of Tyre for 4 years but can't take the city.
722 BC	Siege of Samaria	(Palestine)	Assyrian king Sargon II begins his reign by concluding a siege started by his predecessor Tiglath-Pileser III, bringing a final destructive conquest to the northern Kingdom of Israel after taking their capital.
720 BC	Battle of Raphia (720 BC)	(Palestine)	Assyrians defeat the Egyptian-Philistine alliance, Gaza and Rafah are looted and Assyrian control over Philistia secured.
c. 715 BC	Siege of Hermopolis	(Egypt)	Nubians led by King Piye annex Hermopolis from Egyptians of Nimlot of Hermopolis.
714 BC	Battle of Lake Urmia	(Iran)	King Sargon II of Assyria decisively defeats King Rusa I of Urartu at Lake Urmia, Urartu soon becomes an Assyrian client state.
707 BC	Battle of Xuge	(China)	Zhou dynasty is defeated by State of Zheng in the first open defiance of imperial authority that would start the Spring and Autumn period.
701 BC	Siege of Azekah	(Israel)	Assyrian king Sennacherib takes the city of Azekah from the Kingdom of Judah.
701 BC	Siege of Lachish	(Israel)	Assyrian king Sennacherib takes the city of Lachish from the Kingdom of Judah.
701 BC	Siege of Jerusalem	(Palestine)	Sennacherib besieges the capital of the Kingdom of Judah under Hezekiah. Both sides claim victory.
701 BC	Siege of Tyre	(Lebanon)	Sennacherib unsuccessfully besieges Phoenician city-state of Tyre.
693 BC	Battle of Diyala River	(Iraq)	King Sennacherib of Assyria defeats the Elamites of Southern Iran, led by Mushezib-Marduk, at Diyala River.
691 BC	Battle of Halule	(Iraq)	King Sennacherib of Assyria fights a rebel force, composed of Babylonians, Chaldeans, Aramaeans, Elamites, and the tribes of the Zagros; the battle ended in a draw, although the greatest losses were suffered by the Assyrians.
689 BC	Siege of Babylon	(Iraq)	Sennacherib sacks Babylon and puts down the Babylonians' rebellion.
685 BC	Battle of Deres	(Greece)	Aristomenes of Messenia fights Sparta, with an unknown and disputed end.
684 BC	Battle of Changshao	(China)	Part of Spring and Autumn period. Lu defeats Qi.
682 BC	Battle of the Great Foss	(Greece)	Aristomenes, Androcles, Fidas, and Aristocrates II of the alliance between Messenia and Arcadia are decisively defeated by the Spartans.
680–677 BC	Siege of Sidon	(Lebanon)	Assyrians under Esarhaddon capture, raze and rebuild the Phoenecian city of Sidon and execute their king, Abdi-Milkutti.
679 BC	Battle of Ḫubišna	(Turkey)	Assyrians under Esarhaddon defeat the Cimmerians and kill their King, Teušpâ.
c. 675 BC	Siege of Anshan	(Iran)	Teispes captures the city of Anshan from the Elamites, expanding the burgeoning Persian Kingdom soon after the Persians are freed from Median rule.
671 BC	Siege of Tyre	(Lebanon)	Assyrians under Esarhaddon unsuccessfully besiege Tyre.
669 BC	Battle of Hysiae	(Greece)	The Argives defeat the Lacedaemonians.
663 BC	Siege of Tyre	(Lebanon)	Assyrians under Ashurbanipal unsuccessfully besiege Tyre.
663 BC	Sack of Thebes	(Egypt)	King Asshurbanipal of Assyria, aided by the future indigenous Egyptian Pharaoh of the 26th Dynasty of Egypt Psamtik I, sacks the city and ends the Kushite 25th Dynasty of Egypt. Thebes is permanently weakened as a city.
654 BC	Sack of Sardis	(Turkey)	Cimmerians sack the Lydian capital of Sardis and kill King Gyges of Lydia.
653 BC	Battle of Malitiosa Forest	(Italy)	Romans led by their king Tullus Hostilius decisively defeat the Sabines.
653 BC	Battle of Ulai	(Iran)	Assyrians defeat an Elamite army at the Ulai River, clearing the way to Elam. Elamite king Teumman and his son killed in the battle.
647 BC	Battle of Susa	(Iran)	King Assurbanipal of Assyria takes Susa from Elam, this meaning the end of the Elamites few years after.
645 BC	Battle of Loulin	(China)	Chu (state) defeats Xu in the Spring and Autumn period
642 BC	Battle of Yan	(China)	Duke Xiao of Qi, allied with Song (state) defeats his brothers to become ruler of Qi.
635 BC	Fall of Ashdod	(Israel)	Psamtik I of Egypt takes Ashdod from the Neo-Assyrian Empire, after a 29-year siege.
632 BC	Battle of Chengpu	(China)	Duke Wen of Jin defeats the Chu commander Ziyu in the biggest battle of the Spring and Autumn period.
627 BC	Battle of Xiao	(China)	Part of the Spring and Autumn period. Jin defeats Qin
626 BC	Revolt of Babylon	(Iraq)	Nabopolassar successfully takes Babylon from Assyria and forms the Neo-Babylonian Empire.
616 BC	Battle of Qablin	(Iran)	Babylonians led by king Nabopolassar defeat the Assyrians and Mannaeans.
616 BC	Battle of Arrapḫa	(Iraq)	Babylonians led by king Nabopolassar lose to the Assyrians.
615 BC	Fall of Tarbiṣu	(Iraq)	The Medes led by Cyaxares take the city of Tarbiṣu from Assyria, pushing into their heartland.
614 BC	Fall of Assur	(Iraq)	Nabopolassar of Babylonia and Cyaxares of the Medes take and destroy Assur, capital of Sin- Shar-Ishkun's Assyria.
612 BC	Battle of Nineveh	(Iraq)	The Medes and Scythians join the Babylonians to sack Nineveh, the capital of Assyria.
609 BC	Battle of Megiddo	(Israel)	Necho II of Egypt defeats and kills King Josiah of Judah.
609 BC	Fall of Harran	(Turkey)	Nabopolassar of Babylonia takes the Assyrian city of Harran, ruled by Ashur-uballit II, ending the Assyrian Empire.
609 BC	Siege of Harran	(Turkey)	Egyptian assault of Harran fails.
606 BC	Siege of Kimuhu	(Syria)	Egyptians under Necho II take city of Kimuhu from Babylonians.
605 BC	Battle of Quramati	(Syria)	Egyptians defeat Babylonians east of the Euphrates River.
605 BC	Battle of Carchemish	(Turkey) and (Syria)	Nebuchadrezzar II of Babylon begins reign by defeating Necho II of Egypt.
605 BC	Battle of Hamath	(Syria)	Nebuchadrezzar II of Babylon defeats Necho II of Egypt in Hamath. According to Daniel 1:1 Nebuchadrezzar II takes and despoils Jerusalem, under the rule of Jehoiakim of Judea, but Daniel was written in 167 BC and the siege was 599 BC.
604 BC	Siege of Ashkelon	(Israel)	Babylonia takes and razes the Philistine city of Ashkelon.
597 BC	Siege of Jerusalem	(Palestine)	Babylonia takes and despoils Judah's capital of Jerusalem.
595 BC	Battle of Bi	(China)	Part of the Spring and Autumn period. Chu defeats Jin.
c. 590 BC	Siege of Van	(Turkey)	Medes under Cyaxares overrun and swiftly conquer Urartu.
590 BC	Sack of Napata	(Sudan)	Egyptians under Psamtik II sack and raze Napata, the capital of the Kingdom of Kush.
588 BC	Battle of An	(China)	Part of the Spring and Autumn period. Jin defeats Qi.
587 BC	Siege of Jerusalem	(Palestine)	Babylonia takes and destroys Jerusalem..
586–573 BC	Siege of Tyre	(Lebanon)	Nebuchadnezzar II sieges Tyre for 13 years until the city agrees to pay tribute.
585 BC	Battle of Halys (also known as the Battle of the Eclipse)	(Turkey)	Last battle of the war between Lydians and Medes. A solar eclipse is perceived as an ill omen and the fighting stops.
585 BC	Siege of Kirrha	(Greece)	Amphictyonic League led by Cleisthenes of Sicyon destroys the city of Kirrha after poisoning its water supply during the siege. Last battle of the First Sacred War.
575 BC	Battle of Yanling	(China)	Part of the Spring and Autumn period. Jin defeats Chu.
c. 570 BC	Battle of the Well of Thestis	(Libya)	(Also known as the Battle of Irasa), King Battus II of Cyrenaica defeats the invading Egyptians under Phraoah Apries. First known battle between the Greeks and Egyptians.
552 BC	Battle of Hyrba	(Iran)	Persians under Cyrus the Great defeat Medians under Harpagos.
551 BC	Battle of the Persian Border	(Iran)	Persians under Cyrus the Great defeat Medians under Astyages.
550 BC	Battle of the Fetters	(Greece)	Battle between Sparta and Arcadia.
550 BC	Battle of Pasargadae	(Iran)	Persians under Cyrus the Great defeat Medians under Astyages.
547 BC	Battle of Pteria	(Turkey)	Indecisive battle between Persians under Cyrus the Great and Lydians under Croesus.
547 BC	Battle of Thymbra	(Turkey)	Persians under Cyrus the Great defeat Lydians under Croesus.
547 BC	Siege of Sardis	(Turkey)	Persians under Cyrus the Great take Sardis from Lydians.
546 BC	Battle of Pallene	(Greece)	Peisistratos defeats Athenian army in surprise attack and takes rulership of Athens.
546 BC	Battle of The 300 Champions	(Greece)	The Spartans defeat the Argives in a battle of 300 chosen champions. Only 3 survive.
540 BC	Battle of Alalia	(France)	Carthaginian and Etruscan fleets defeat Phocaeans.
540 BC	Siege of Xanthos	(Turkey)	Persians under Harpagos take Xanthos, the capital of Lycia.
539 BC	Battle of Opis	(Iraq)	Persians under Cyrus the Great defeat Babylonians.
526 BC	Siege of Gaza	(Palestine)	Persians under Cambyses II capture Gaza after a long siege.
525 BC	Battle of Pelusium	(Egypt)	Persians under Cambyses II defeat Egyptians under Psamtik III.
525 BC	Petubastis III Dakhla ambush	(Egypt)	Evidence from excavations at the Dakhla Oasis show that the Persian Lost Army of Cambyses was not destroyed by a sandstorm, but rather ambushed and defeated by Egyptian pharaoh, Petubastis III.
513 BC	Capture of Gelonos	(Ukraine) or (Russia)	Persians under Darius the Great take Gelonos from Budini and Gelonians which is subsequently destroyed.
509 BC	Battle of Silva Arsia	(Italy)	Roman Republic defeats Etruscan forces from Tarquinii and Veii led by deposed Roman king Lucius Tarquinius Superbus.
508 BC	Siege of Rome	(Italy)	Etruscan forces besiege Rome, ending in a peace treaty; monarchy stays abolished in Rome.
506 BC	Battle of Boju	(China)	Forces of Wu under Sun Tzu, defeat the forces of Chu.
502 BC	Battle of Pometia	(Italy)	Roman forces defeat rebellion by Latin towns

== 5th century BC ==
Year	Battle	Loc.	Description
499 BC	Siege of Naxos	(Greece)	Persians unsuccessfully besiege Naxos.
498 BC	Siege of Sardis	(Turkey)	Greek coalition takes Sardis which is subsequently destroyed.
498 BC	Battle of Ephesos	(Turkey)	Persians defeat Greek coalition.
498 BC	Siege of Amathus	(Cyprus)	Cypriots under Onesilus unsuccessfully besiege Amathus.
496 BC	Battle of Lake Regillus	(Italy)	Romans defeat either the Etruscans or the Latins.
494 BC	Battle of Lade	(Turkey)	Persians defeat Greek coalition.
494 BC	Battle of Sepeia	(Greece)	Spartan forces of Cleomenes I defeat the Argives, fully establishing Spartan dominance in the Peloponnese.
493 BC	Battle of Corioli	(Italy)	Romans take town from the Volsci.
490 BC	Siege of Naxos	(Greece)	Persians take Naxos which is subsequently destroyed.
490 BC	Siege of Eretria	(Greece)	Persians take Eretria.
490 BC	Battle of Marathon	(Greece)	Greek coalition under Miltiades defeats Persians.
490 BC	Siege of Kāśī	(India)	Ajatashatru annexes Kāśī and Kosala for Magadha.
480 BC	Battle of Thermopylae	(Greece)	Persians under Xerxes defeat a coalition of Greek forces led by the Spartans commanded by King Leonidas.
480 BC	Battle of Artemisium	(Greece)	Persian fleet fights an inconclusive battle with the Greek allied fleet.
480 BC	Battle of Salamis	(Greece)	Greek ships under Themistocles and Eurybiades of Sparta defeat Persian fleet in the Bay of Eleusis.
480 BC	Battle of Himera	(Italy)	The Greeks of Sicily, led by Gelo of Syracuse, defeat the Carthaginians under Hamilcar I of Carthage, who dies in the battle.
479 BC	Battle of Plataea	(Greece)	Ends the Persian invasion of Greece; Pausanias, the Spartan commander of the Greek army, routs the armies of Mardonius.
479 BC	Battle of Mycale	(Turkey)	Greeks under Leotychidas sail to Asia Minor, attack the Persian fleet, and defeat the 60,000 Persian troops.
479 BC	Siege of Sestos	(Turkey)	Athens take Sestos from Persians, capture and crucify their governor Artayctes the Persian general.
478 BC	Siege of Byzantium	(Turkey)	Byzantium lost by Persians.
478 BC	Battle of Lize	(China)	Yue defeats Wu, gaining much territory, during the Warring States period of Chinese history.
477 BC	Battle of the Cremera	(Italy)	The Etruscan city of Veii defeats the Roman Republic at Cremera.
475 BC	Siege of Eion	(Greece)	The Delian League takes Eion from the Persians.
474 BC	Battle of Cumae	(Italy)	The Syracusans under Hiero I defeat the Etruscans and end Etruscan expansion in southern Italy.
473 BC	Battle of Kailia	(Italy)	Iapygians defeat the Greek colonies of Taras and Rhegion in Magna Graecia with heavy losses on both sides. According to Herodotus this was the greatest death count among Greeks in a singular battle to his memory.
466 BC	Battle of the Eurymedon	(Turkey)	Athenians under Cimon defeat the Persians in a great naval battle.
460 BC	Battle of Hyria	(Italy)	Taras defeats Messapians and Peucetians.
459 BC	Battle of Papremis	(Egypt)	Athenians and Egyptian rebels defeat Persians.
458 BC	Battle of Mount Algidus	(Italy)	Romans under Cincinnatus defeat the Aequi.
458 BC	Battle of Aegina	(Greece)	Athens defeats Aegina
457 BC	Battle of Tanagra	(Greece)	The Spartans defeat the Athenians near Thebes, Greece.
457 BC	Battle of Oenophyta	(Greece)	The Athenians defeat the Thebans and take control of Boeotia.
454 BC	Siege of Prosoptis	(Egypt)	Persia re-establishes control over Egypt.
454 BC	Battle of Mendesium	(Egypt)	Fifty Athenian triremes try to relieve Prosoptis unaware it succumbed, most triremes sunk by Persians.
453 BC	Battle of Jinyang	(China)	Decisive battle leading to the partition of the state of Jin into three smaller states of Zhao, Han, and Wei, which became three of the seven warring states in China.
450 BC	Siege of Citium	(Cyprus)	Persia maintains control over Cyprus.
450 BC	Battle of Salamis	(Cyprus)	Athenians under Cimon defeat the Persian fleet at Cyprus.
450 BC	Battle of Nomae	(Italy)	Greeks defeat Sicels of Ducetius
447 BC	Battle of Coronea	(Greece)	The Athenians are driven from Boeotia.
446 BC	Battle of Corbio	(Italy)	Roman General Titus gains a victory over the Aequi tribes.
446 BC	Battle of the Himera	(Italy)	Syracuse defeats Akragas
435 BC	Capture of Fidenae	(Italy)	Romans defeat the Veii.
435 BC	Battle of Leukimme	(Greece)	Corcyra defeats Corinth.
435 BC	Siege of Epidamnos	(Albania)	Corcyra takes their former colony of Epidamnus.
433 BC	Battle of Sybota	(Greece)	Athenians and Corcyreans fight the Corinthians.
432 BC	Battle of Potidaea	(Greece)	Athens defeats Sparta, leading to the Peloponnesian War.
429 BC	Battle of Spartolos	(Greece)	Chalcidians and their allies defeat Athens.
429 BC	Battle of Rhium	(Greece)	Naval defeat of the Peloponnesians by Athens.
429 BC	Battle of Naupactos	(Greece)	Phormion defeats the Peloponnesian fleet.
427 BC	Mytilenean revolt	(Greece)	Athens ends Mytilenian revolt.
427 BC	Siege of Plataea	(Greece)	Sparta besieges and destroys Plataea.
426 BC	Battle of Tanagra	(Greece)	Athenians under Nicias defeat Tanagra and Thebes.
426 BC	Battle of Olpae	(Greece)	Athenians under Demosthenes defeat the Spartans in Aetolia.
426 BC	Battle of Idomene	(Greece)	Demosthenes of Athens defeats Ambracia.
425 BC	Battle of Pylos	(Greece)	Athenians under Demosthenes again defeat the Spartans, this time capturing a Spartan fleet and leaving a Spartan contingent isolated on the island of Sphacteria.
425 BC	Battle of Sphacteria	(Greece)	Demosthenes and Cleon capture the Spartans on Sphacteria.
424 BC	Battle of Megara	(Greece)	Athens encounters defeat at Megara.
424 BC	Battle of Delion	(Greece)	Another Athenian invasion of Boeotia is unsuccessful.
423 BC	Battle of Lyncestis	(Greece) or (North Macedonia)	Illyrians and Lyncestians fight the Spartans and Macedonians during the Peloponnessian War.
422 BC	Battle of Amphipolis	(Greece)	The Spartans under Brasidas defeat the Athenians under Cleon; both generals die.
418 BC	Battle of Mantinea	(Greece)	The Spartans under King Agis II defeat the Argives, Mantineans, and Athenians.
417 BC	Battle of Hysiae	(Greece)	Spartans march against Argos with their allies, yet fail to take the city itself, instead capturing Hysiae
417 BC	Battle of Orneae	(Greece)	Argives and Athenians defeat Spartan garrison
415 BC	Battle of Melos	(Greece)	Athens invades Melos.
413 BC	Sicilian Expedition	(Italy)	The Athenian expedition in Sicily, under Nicias and Demosthenes, is annihilated.
411 BC	Battle of Eretria	(Greece)	Spartans defeat the Athenian fleet.
411 BC	Battle of Syme	(Greece)	Spartans defeat Athenian fleet; Persia is drawn into the Peloponnesian War.
411 BC	Battle of Abydos	(Turkey)	Athenian navy defeats Spartan fleet.
411 BC	Battle of Cynossema	(Turkey)	The Athenians under Alcibiades defeat the Spartan fleet.
410 BC	Battle of Cyzicus	(Turkey)	The Athenian fleet, under the leadership of Alcibiades, destroys the Spartan fleet.
409 BC	Battle of Selinus	(Italy)	Dorian Greek city Selinus destroyed by Carthage.
409 BC	Battle of Himera	(Italy)	Ionian Greek city Himera destroyed by Carthage.
406 BC	Battle of Notion	(Turkey)	The Spartans under Lysander defeat a segment of the Athenian fleet under Antiochus.
406 BC	Battle of Mytilene	(Greece)	Sparta defeats Athens.
406 BC	Battle of Arginusae	(Turkey)	The final Athenian victory of the Peloponnesian War.
406 BC	Siege of Akragas	(Italy)	Dorian Greek city Akragas sacked by Carthage.
405 BC	Battle of Gela	(Italy)	Dorian Greek city Gela sacked by Carthage.
405 BC	Battle of Aegospotami	(Turkey)	The final battle of the Peloponnesian War; Lysander destroys the navy of Athens led by Conon.
405 BC	Sack of Camarina	(Italy)	Carthaginians sack Sicilian Greek city of Camarina.
404 or 403 BC	Battle of Phyle	(Greece)	The Athenian exiles, seeking to restore democracy in Athens, defeat the Spartans.
404 or 403 BC	Battle of Munychia	(Greece)	The Athenian exiles, in their search for democracy in Athens, defeat the oligarchic government of Athens.
403 BC	Battle of Piraeus	(Greece)	The Athenian exiles, led by Thrasybulus, are finally defeated by the Spartans of Pausanias, both sides suffering tremendous casualties. However, Piraeus and Athens are reunited and the democratic government of Athens is reestablished.
402 BC	Battle of Altis	(Greece)	Eleans defeat Spartans at Olympia.
401 BC	Battle of Cunaxa	(Iraq)	Artaxerxes II defeats Kyros the Younger who is killed in the fighting.

== 4th century BC ==
Year	Battle	Loc.	Description
398 BC	Siege of Motya	(Italy)	Phoenician city Motya sacked by Sicilian Greeks.
397 BC	Battle of Messene	(Italy)	Ionian Greek city Messene sacked by Carthage.
397 BC	Battle of Catana	(Italy)	Greek fleet defeated by Carthage.
397 BC	Siege of Syracuse	(Italy)	Battle between Syracuse and Carthage. Part of the Sicilian Wars. Greek victory.
396 BC	Battle of Veii	(Italy)	Romans complete conquest of Etruscans.
395 BC	Battle of Haliartus	(Greece)	The Spartan general Lysander is killed in a Spartan defeat by the Thebans.
395 BC	Battle of Sardis	(Turkey)	King Agesilaus II of Sparta defeats Persia, under satrap Tissaphernes of Lydia.
394 BC	Battle of Nemea	(Greece)	Spartans defeat the Thebans, Athenians, Argives, and Corinthians.
394 BC	Battle of Cnidus	(Turkey)	The Spartan fleet under Peisander is utterly destroyed by the Persian-Athenian fleet of Conon.
394 BC	Battle of Coronea	(Greece)	King Agesilaus II of Sparta defeats the Thebans.
394 BC	Siege of Tauromenium	(Italy)	Syracuse besieges the Sicels
393 BC	Battle of Abacaenum	(Italy)	Small Carthaginian army defeated by Dionysius I of Syracuse
392 BC	Battle of Chrysas	(Italy)	Inconclusive last battle of the Third Sicilian War
391 BC	Battle of Lechaeum	(Greece)	Iphicrates of Athens defeats Sparta during the Corinthian War.
390 BC	Battle of the Allia	(Italy)	Celtic Coalition under Brennus defeat Romans under Quitnus Sulpicius Longus.
389 BC	Battle of the Elleporus	(Italy)	Dionysius I of Syracuse defeats the Italiote League, securing his domination of Greek Southern Italy.
389 BC	Siege of Theodosia	(Ukraine)	Bosporan Kingdom tries to take Theodosia but fails
386 BC	Siege of Rhegium	(Italy)	Dionysius I of Syracuse conquers the city and sells the inhabitants into slavery.
385 BC	Siege of Mantinea	(Greece)	Sparta destroys Mantinea
384 BC	Battle of Pharos	(Croatia)	Liburnians defeat Greek colony of Pharos and Syracuse.
380 BC	Battle of Labrytai	(Russia)	Bosporan Kingdom conquers the Sindlike Kingdom
377 BC	Battle of Cabala	(Italy)	Syracuse defeats Carthage
376 BC	Battle of Cronium	(Italy)	Carthage defeats Syracuse, ending the Fourth Sicilian War
376 BC	Battle of Naxos	(Greece)	The Athenians under Chabrias defeat the Spartans at sea.
375 BC	Battle of Tegyra	(Greece)	Pelopidas of Thebes defeats Sparta.
374 BC	Battle of Alyzia	(Greece)	Athenian navy defeats Spartan navy.
373 BC	Battle of Pelusium (373 BC)	(Egypt)	Egyptian victory
371 BC	Battle of Leuctra	(Greece)	Spartans under king Cleombrotus lose to the Thebans under Epaminondas – Cleombrotus is killed. This ends the period of Spartan domination of Greece
365 BC	Siege of Theodosia	(Ukraine)	Bosporan Kingdom again tries to take Theodosia and again fails
364 BC	Battle of Cynoscephalae	(Greece)	The Thebans under Pelopidas fight a drawn battle with Alexander of Pherae in Thessaly. Pelopidas is killed.
362 BC	Battle of Mantinea	(Greece)	The Thebans and their allies, under Epaminondas, defeat the Spartans and Athenians, but Epaminondas himself is killed, ending the brief period of Theban domination.
361 BC	Battle of the Anio	(Italy)	Romans under Titus Quinctius Pennus defeat Celtic Coalition.
360 BC	Siege of Theodosia	(Ukraine)	Bosporan Kingdom besieges Theodosia for the third time, this time taking the city
359 BC	Battle of Methone	(Greece)	Philip II of Macedon defeats 3,000 Athenian mercenaries on the Macedonian coast.
358 BC	Battle of Pedum	(Italy)	Romans under Gaius Sulpicius Peticus defeat Celtic Coalition.
358 BC	Battle of Erigon Valley	(North Macedonia)	Philip II of Macedon defeats the Kingdom of Dardania, expanding Macedonia to their northwestern frontier.
356 BC	Battle of Embata	(Greece)	Athenians under Chares, Iphicrates, and Timotheos are defeated by the Chians at Chios, Greece.
353 BC	Battle of Crocus Field	(Greece)	Philip II of Macedon defeats the Phocians in the Third Sacred War.
353 BC	Battle of Guiling	(China)	Tian Ji and Sun Bin of Qi defeat Pang Juan of Wei at Handan during the Warring States period of China.
343 BC	Battle of Mount Gaurus	(Italy)	Roman general Marcus Valerius Corvus defeats the Samnites.
343 BC	Battle of Suessula	(Italy)	The Roman Republic beats the Samnites, but is forced to withdraw due to the revolt of several of its Latin allies.
343 BC	Siege of Syracuse	(Italy)	Corinthian General Timoleon leads coalition with the other Sicilian Greek cities to intervene in Hicetas of Leontini's attempt to capture Syracuse, defeating him, his Carthaginian allies, Syracuse's tyrant Dionysius II of Syracuse and restoring democracy to Syracuse.
342 BC	Battle of Maling	(China)	Tian Ji and Sun Bin of Qi again defeat Pang Juan of Wei, this time at Dazhangija Town, Shen County, in Henan Province.
340 BC	Siege of Byzantium	(Turkey)	A siege by Philip II of Macedonia.
339 BC	Battle of Vesuvius	(Italy)	Romans under P. Decius Mus and T. Manlius Imperiosus defeat the rebellious Latins.
339 BC	Battle of the Crimissus	(Italy)	Syracuse under Timoleon defeats Carthage.
339 BC	Battle of Dobruja	(Romania)	Macedon under King Philip II defeats the Scythians under King Ateas, who is killed in battle.
338 BC	Battle of Chaeronea	(Greece)	2 August – Philip of Macedon crushes Athens and Thebes in their struggle to maintain their independence.
338 BC	Battle of Trifanum	(Italy)	Roman general T. Manlius Imperiosus decisively defeats the Latins.
338 BC	Battle of Manduria	(Italy)	Sparta and its colony Taras both defeated by Lucanians and Messapians in front of the walls of Manduria. Spartan king Archidamus III killed.
335 BC	Battle of Mount Haimos	(Bulgaria)	Macedonians under Alexander the Great defeat Thracians.
335 BC	Siege of Pelion	(Albania) , (Greece) or (North Macedonia)	Macedonians under Alexander the Great defeat Illyrians.
335 BC	Battle of Thebes	(Greece)	Macedonians under Alexander the Great take Thebes which is subsequently destroyed.
334 BC	Battle of the Granikos	(Turkey)	Macedonians under Alexander the Great defeat Persians.
334 BC	Siege of Miletos	(Turkey)	Macedonians under Alexander the Great take Miletos from Persians.
334 BC	Siege of Halikarnassos	(Turkey)	Macedonians under Alexander the Great take Halikarnassos from Persians.
333 BC	Siege of Gordion	(Turkey)	Macedonians under Parmenion take Gordion from Persians.
333 BC	Battle of Issos	(Turkey)	Macedonians under Alexander the Great defeat Persians under Dareios III.
332 BC	Siege of Tyros	(Lebanon)	Macedonians under Alexander the Great take Tyre.
332 BC	Siege of Gaza	(Palestine)	Macedonians under Alexander the Great take Gaza.
331 BC	Battle of Pandosia	(Italy)	Italian coalition defeats Alexander I of Epirus, who is killed in the fighting.
331 BC	Battle of Megalopolis	(Greece)	Macedonians under Antipatros defeat Spartans under Agis III.
331 BC	Siege of Olbia	(Ukraine)	Scythians and the city of Olbia decisively defeat Macedonians under Zopyrion.
331 BC	Battle of Gaugamela	(Iraq)	Macedonians under Alexander the Great defeat Persians under Dareios III.
331 BC	Battle of the Uxian Defile	(Iran)	Macedonians under Alexander the Great defeat the Uxians.
330 BC	Battle of the Persian Gate	(Iran)	Macedonians under Alexander the Great defeat the Persians.
329 BC	Battle of the Polytimetos		Sogdians and Saka unter Spitmanes defeat Macedonians under Pharnuches
329 BC	Siege of Kyropolis	(Tajikistan)	Macedonians under Alexander the Great take Kyroplis from Sogdians.
329 BC	Battle of the Jaxartes	(Uzbekistan) , (Tajikistan) , (Kyrgyzstan) or (Kazakhstan)	Macedonians under Alexander the Great defeat the Saka.
328 BC	Battle of Gabai	(Uzbekistan)	Macedonians under Koinos defeat Sogdians under Spitamenes.
327 BC	Capture of Neapolis	(Italy)	The Samnites take the city of Neapolis from Rome.
327 BC	Siege of the Sogdian Rock	(Tajikistan)	Macedonians under Alexander the Great take the Sogdian Rock from Sogdians.
327 BC	Siege of Aornos	(Pakistan)	Macedonians under Alexander the Great take Aornos.
326 BC	Battle of the Hydaspes	(Pakistan)	Macedonians under Alexander the Great defeat Poros.
325 BC	Battle of Imbrinium	(Italy)	Romans under Quintus Fabius Maximus Rullianus defeat the Samnites.
323 BC	Battle of Plataea	(Greece)	Athenians defeat Boeotians who are allied to Macedon.
323 BC	Battle of Thermopylae	(Greece)	Greek Coalition defeats Macedonians under Antipatros.
322 BC	Siege of Lamia	(Greece)	Greek Coalition unsuccessfully besieges Macedonians under Antipatros in Malis.
322 BC	Battle of Amorgos	(Greece)	Kleitos the White defeats Athenians at sea.
322 BC	Battle of Echinades	(Greece)	Kleitos the White defeats Athenians at sea.
322 BC	Battle of Melitea	(Greece)	Greek Coalition defeats Macedonians under Leonnatos who is killed in the fighting.
322 BC	Battle of Krannon	(Greece)	Macedonians under Antipatros and Krateros defeat Greek Coalition.
322 BC	Battle of Pataliputra	(India)	Chandragupta Maurya attacks the capital of the Nanda Empire
321 BC	Battle of the Caudine Forks	(Italy)	The Romans under Spurius Postumius and T. Verturius Calvinus are defeated by the Samnites under Gaius Pontius.
321 BC	Battle of the Hellespont	(Turkey)	Eumenes defeats Krateros and Neoptolemos who are killed in the fighting.
321 BC	Battle of the Camel's rampart	(Egypt)	Perdikkas fails in crossing the Nile against Ptolemaios and is subsequently assassinated.
319 BC	Battle of Orkynia	(Turkey)	Antigonos Monophthalmos defeats Eumenes.
319 BC	Battle of Kretopolis	(Turkey)	Antigonos Monophthalmos defeats Perdiccan Coalition under Alketas.
318 BC	Siege of Nora	(Turkey)	Antigonos Monophthalmos unsuccessfully besieges Eumenes.
317 BC	Siege of Megalopolis	(Greece)	Polyperchon unsuccessfully besieges Megalopolis which is allied to Kassandros.
317 BC	Battle of Byzantion	(Greece)	Antigonos Monophthalmos and Nikanor defeat Kleitos the White at sea.
317 BC	Battle of Euia	(Albania)	Epirotes under Aiakides and Olympias defeat Macedonians under Philipp III and Eurydike.
317 BC	Battle of the Kopratas	(Iran)	Eumenes defeats advance force of Antigonos Monophthalmos.
317 BC	Battle of Paraitakene	(Iran)	Indecisive battle between Antigonos Monophthalmos and Eumenes.
316 BC	Siege of Pydna	(Greece)	Kassandros takes Pydna under Olympias who is subsequently captured alongside Roxana and Alexander IV.
315 BC	Battle of Lautulae	(Italy)	The Romans are defeated by the Samnites.
315 BC	Battle of Gabiene	(Iran)	Antigonos Monophthalmos defeats Eumenes who is subsequently executed.
314 BC	Siege of Tyros	(Lebanon)	Antigonos Monophthalmos takes Tyre from Ptolemaics.
313 BC	Battle of Oineiadai	(Greece)	Macedonians under Philippos defeat Epirotes under Aiakides who is killed in the fighting.
312 BC	Battle of Gaza	(Palestine)	Ptolemaios and Seleukos defeat Demetrios.
311 BC	Battle of Myus	(Syria)	Demetrios defeats Ptolemaics under Killes.
311 BC	Battle of Himera	(Italy)	The Carthaginian general Hamilcar defeats the tyrant Agathocles of Syracuse, who is then besieged in Syracuse.
311 BC	Siege of Babylon	(Iraq)	Seleukos takes Babylon from Antigonids.
311 BC	Battle of the Tigris	(Iraq)	Seleukos defeats Antigonids under Nikanor and Eaugoras.
310 BC	Battle of Lake Vadimo	(Italy)	The Romans defeat the Etruscans.
310 BC	Siege of Babylon	(Iraq)	Seleukos and Patrokles defeat Antigonids under Demetrios and Archelaos.
310 BC	Battle of the Thatis	(Russia)	Satyros II of the Bosporan Kingdom allied with the Scythians defeats his brother Eumelos and his Sarmatian army in the opening battle of the Bosporan Civil War.
310 BC	Battle of White Tunis	(Tunisia)	Agathocles of Syracuse defeats Carthage in Africa
310 BC	Siege of Syracuse	(Italy)	Syracuse repels a Carthaginian siege of the city
309 BC	Siege of Babylon	(Iraq)	Antigonos takes Babylon from Seleucids.
309 BC	Battle of the 25 of Abu	(Iraq) or (Iran)	Seleukos defeats Antigonos who is subsequently forced to recognise Seleucid rule over Babylonia, Elam and Media.
309 BC	Siege of Siracena	(Russia)	Satyros II is killed while besieging Eumelos
309 BC	Battle of Lake Maeotis	(Ukraine)	Eumelos defeats his brother Prytanis and takes the throne of the Bosporan Kingdom, ending the civil war
306 BC	Battle of Salamis	(Cyprus)	Demetrios defeats Menelaos at sea, Cyprus is subsequently taken from Ptolemaics.
305 BC	Battle of Bovianum	(Italy)	The Roman consuls M. Fulvius and L. Postumius decisively defeat the Samnites to end the Second Samnite War.
305-304 BC	Siege of Rhodes	(Greece)	Demetrios I Poliorketes unsuccessfully besieges Rhodes.
301 BC	Battle of Ipsos	(Turkey)	Seleukos I and Lysimachos defeat Demetrios I Poliorketes and Antigonos I Monophthalmos, who is killed in the fighting.

== 3rd century BC ==
Year	Battle	Loc.	Description
298 BC	Battle of Camerinum	(Italy)	The Samnites allied with the Gauls defeat the Romans under Lucius Cornelius Scipio in the first battle of the Third Samnite War.
297 BC	Battle of Tifernum	(Italy)	Roman forces defeat the Samnites in Umbria.
295 BC	Battle of Sentinum	(Italy)	The Romans under Fabius Rullianus and Publius Decimus Mus defeat the Samnites and their Etruscan and Gallic allies, forcing the Etruscans, Gauls, and Umbrians to make peace.
293 BC	Battle of Aquilonia	(Italy)	The Romans decisively defeat the Samnites.
293 BC	Battle of Yique	(China)	Qin forces defeat the allied states of Wei and Han, leading to Qin's further superiority in China.
291 BC	Siege of Thebes	(Greece)	Demetrios I Poliorketes takes Thebes.
287 BC	Siege of Athens	(Greece)	Demetrios I Poliorketes unsuccessfully besieges Athens.
284 BC	Battle of Arretium	(Italy)	A Roman army under Lucius Caecilius is destroyed by the Gauls.
283 BC	Battle of Lake Vadimo	(Italy)	A Roman army under P. Cornelius Dolabello defeats the Etruscans and Gauls.
282 BC	Battle of Populonia	(Italy)	Etruscan resistance to Roman domination of Italy is finally crushed.
281 BC	Battle of Kurupedion	(Turkey)	Seleukos I defeats Lysimachos who is killed in the fighting.
280 BC	Battle of Heraclea	(Italy)	Pyrrhos I defeats Romans under Publius Valerius Leavinus.
279 BC	Battle of Asculum	(Italy)	Pyrrhos I defeats Romans under Publius Decius Mus.
279 BC	Battle of Thermopylae	(Greece)	Invading Gaulic forces under Brennus defeat a Greek alliance and advance on the Balkans.
279 BC	Attack on Delphi	(Greece)	Gauls decisively defeated by Greek alliance while trying to sack Delphi. Brennus commits suicide during the retreat.
278 BC	Siege of Syracuse	(Italy)	Carthaginians unsuccessfully besiege Syracuse.
278 BC	Siege of Lilybaeum	(Italy)	Pyrrhos I unsuccessfully besieges Lilybaeum.
277 BC	Battle of Lysimachia	(Turkey)	Macedonian Antigonid forces versus Gallic tribes that had settled in the Thracian Chersonese.
277 BC	Battle of the Cranita hills	(Italy)	Samnites defeat Romans under Publius Cornelius Rufinus and Caius Junius Bubulcus.
276 BC	Battle of the Strait of Messina	(Italy)	Carthaginians defeat Pyrrhos I at sea.
275 BC	Battle of Beneventum	(Italy)	Romans under Manius Curius Dentatus defeat Pyrrhos I who subsequently leaves Italy with most of his army.
275 BC	Battle of the Elephants	(Turkey)	King Antiochus I Soter of the Seleucid Empire defeats the Galatians.
274 BC	Battle of the Aous	(Albania) or (Greece)	Pyrrhos I defeats Macedonians under Antigonos II Gonatas.
272 BC	Siege of Sparta	(Greece)	Pyrrhos I unsuccessfully besieges Sparta.
272 BC	Battle of Argos	(Greece)	Coalition under Antigonos II Gonatas defeats Pyrrhos I who is killed in the fighting.
272 BC	Siege of Taras	(Italy)	Romans take Taras.
264 BC	Battle of Messana	(Italy)	Rome defeats Carthage in the first battle of the First Punic War
262 BC	Battle of Agrigentum	(Italy)	Carthaginian forces under Hannibal Gisco and Hanno are defeated by the Romans, giving them control of most of Sicily.
261 BC	Battle of Cos	(Italy)	Naval victory of Antigonus II Gonatas over Ptolemy II.
261 BC	Battle of Kalinga	(India)	Ashoka the Great conquers Kalinga for the Maurya Empire.
260 BC	Battle of Changping	(China)	Army of Qin under Bai Qi routed army of Zhao and massacred 500,000 prisoners of war. Military superiority of Qin over all other states of China. Unification became a matter of time.
260 BC	Battle of Lipara Islands	(Italy)	A Roman naval force is defeated by the Carthaginians.
260 BC	Battle of Mylae	(Italy)	A Roman naval force under C. Duillius defeats the Carthaginian fleet, giving Rome control of the western Mediterranean.
259 BC	Battle of Thermae	(Italy)	Carthaginian defeat Romans in Sicily
258 BC	Battle of Ephesus	(Turkey)	Rhodians under Agathostratus defeat a Ptolemaic fleet under Chremonides.
258 BC	Battle of Sulci	(Italy)	Minor Roman naval victory during First Punic War.
257 BC	Battle of Tyndaris	(Italy)	Sicilian town captured by Rome.
257 BC	Battle of Handan	(China)	States of Zhao, Chu, and Wei defeat Qin.
256 BC	Battle of Cape Ecnomus	(Italy)	A Carthaginian fleet under Hamilcar and Hanno is defeated in an attempt to stop a Roman invasion of Africa by Marcus Atilius Regulus.
255 BC	Siege of Aspis	(Tunisia)	Rome takes the city of Aspis in Africa
255 BC	Battle of Adys	(Tunisia)	The Romans under Regulus defeat the Carthaginians in North Africa.
255 BC	Battle of Tunis	(Tunisia)	The Carthaginians under Xanthippus, a Greek mercenary, defeat the Romans under Regulus, who is captured.
255 BC	Battle of Cape Hermaeum	(Tunisia)	Romans defeat Carthaginian fleet and successfully evacuate their army from Africa
251 BC	Battle of Panormus	(Italy)	Carthaginian forces under Hasdrubal are defeated by the Romans under L. Caecilius Metellus.
250 BC	Siege of Lilybaeum	(Italy)	Rome takes Lilybaeum after a long siege
250 BC	Battle of Panormus	(Italy)	Roman army led by Consul Metellus defeats Carthaginian army led by General Hasdrubal
249 BC	Battle of Drepana	(Italy)	Carthaginians under Adherbal defeat the fleet of Roman admiral Claudius Pulcher.
249 BC	Battle of Phintias	(Italy)	Carthage destroys a large Roman navy
248 BC	Siege of Drepana	(Italy)	Rome besieges Drepana
246 BC	Battle of Andros	(Greece)	Ptolemy III loses the Cyclades to Antigonus II of Macedonia.
241 BC	Battle of the Aegates Islands	(Italy)	Roman sea victory over the Carthaginians, ending the First Punic War
241 BC	Battle of the Caecus River	(Turkey)	Attalus I defeats the Galatians
240 BC	Battle of Utica	(Tunisia)	Rebellious Carthaginian mercenaries defeats the Carthaginian army of Hanno II the Great
240 BC	Battle of the Bagradas River	(Tunisia)	Hamilcar defeats mercenary troops, making it the first Punic victory in the Mercenary Wars.
240 BC	Hamilcar's victory with Naravas	(Tunisia)	Hamilcar again defeats the mercenary forces, this time with the help of the Numidian defector Naravas
240 BC	Hamilcar's defeat of Spendius and Autaritus	(Tunisia)	Hamilcar defeats another mercenary army led by Spendius and Autaritus
239 BC	Battle of Ancyra	(Turkey)	Antiochus Hierax defeats Seleucus II Callinicus
239 BC	Tunliu rebellion	(China)	Qin victory, Chengjiao the younger half-brother of Qin Shi Huang is killed .
238 BC	Battle of "The Saw"	(Tunisia)	Hamilcar defeats a great mercenary army at Tunis.
238 BC	Battle of Aphrodisium	(Turkey)	Attalus I of Pergamon defeats Antiochus Hierax
238 BC	Battle of Leptis Parva	(Tunisia)	Final battle of the Mercenary War
233 BC	Battle of Fei	(China)	Zhou defeat the Qin
231 BC	Siege of Medion	(Greece)	Illyrians under Agron defeat the Aetolian League
230 BC	Battle of Phoenice	(Albania)	Illyrians defeat the Epirotes
229 BC	Battle of Paxos	(Greece)	Illyrians defeat the Aetolian League and Achaean League
229 BC	Battle of the Harpasus	(Turkey)	Attalus again defeats Antiochus Hierax and takes over much of Anatolia
229 BC	Battle of Epidamnus	(Albania)	Greeks of Epirus beat back Illyrians.
229 BC	Siege of Issa	(Croatia)	Romans lift Illyrian siege of Greek city of Issa.
227 BC	Battle of Mount Lycaeum	(Greece)	Cleomenes III of Sparta defeats the Achaean League
226 BC	Battle of Dyme	(Greece)	Sparta again defeats the Achaean League decisively, resulting in a peace treaty.
225 BC	Battle of Faesulae	(Italy)	The Romans are defeated by the Gauls of Northern Italy.
225 BC	Battle of Telamon	(Italy)	The Romans under Aemilius Papus and Caius Atilius Regulus defeat the Gauls.
222 BC	Battle of Clastidium	(Italy)	The Romans under Marcus Claudius Marcellus defeat the Gauls.
222 BC	Battle of Sellasia	(Greece)	Defeat of Cleomenes III of Sparta by Antigonus Doson of Macedon and the Achaean League.
222 BC	Battle of Dai	(China)	Qin under Qin Shihuang defeat the army of and eliminate the Zhou dynasty in their unification of China.
219 BC	Siege of Dimallum	(Albania)	Romans take city from Illyrians and defeat forces of Demetrius of Pharos.
219 BC	Siege of Saguntum	(Spain)	Hannibal of Carthage lays siege to the city of Saguntum in Spain, marking the start of the Second Punic War.
218 BC	Battle of Lilybaeum	(Italy)	Roman naval forces under Amellius defeat the Carthaginians, ending their attempts to colonize Sicily.
218 BC	Capture of Malta	(Malta)	Roman forces capture Malta
218 BC	Battle of Rhone Crossing	(France)	Hannibal defeats the Volcae Gauls, staying undefeated in his march for Italy.
218 BC	Battle of the Ticinus	(Italy)	November – Hannibal defeats the Romans under Publius Cornelius Scipio the elder in a small cavalry fight.
218 BC	Battle of the Trebia	(Italy)	Hannibal defeats the Romans under Tiberius Sempronius Longus, who had foolishly attacked.
218 BC	Battle of Cissa	(Spain)	Roman forces defeat a Catharginian army under Hanno, controlling the territory north of Ebro river.
217 BC	Battle of Raphia	(Palestine)	22 June – Antiochus III the Great is defeated by Ptolemy IV.
217 BC	Battle of Lake Trasimene	(Italy)	24 June – In an ambush, Hannibal destroys the Roman army of Gaius Flaminius, who is killed.
217 BC	Battle of Ebro River	(Spain)	Roman naval forces destroy a Carthaginian fleet under Himilco, weakening Carthage's influence in Iberia.
217 BC	Battle of Ager Falernus	(Italy)	Hannibal defeats Roman forces under Quintus Fabius Maximus.
217 BC	Battle of Geronium	(Italy)	Hannibal fights Roman forces in Apulia, resulting in a strategic draw.
217 BC	Battle of Leontion	(Greece)	The Achaean League under Lycus of Pharae defeats Aetolian League and Elis under Euripidas of Aetolia.
216 BC	Battle of Cannae	(Italy)	2 August – Hannibal destroys the Roman army of Lucius Aemilius Paulus and Publius Terentius Varro in what is considered one of the great masterpieces of the tactical art.
216 BC	Battle of Silva Litana	(Italy)	Gallic Boii tribe ambush and destroy a Roman army
216 BC	First Battle of Nola	(Italy)	The Roman general Marcus Claudius Marcellus holds off an attack by Hannibal.
215 BC	Battle of Ibera	(Spain)	A Roman army under Gnaeus Cornelius Scipio Calvus and Publius Cornelius Scipio destroys Carthaginian forces under Hasdrubal.
215 BC	Second Battle of Nola	(Italy)	Marcellus again repulses an attack by Hannibal.
215 BC	Battle of Decimomannu	(Italy)	Roman forces under Torquatus defeat a Carthaginian army under Hasdrubal the Bald in Sardinia.
214 BC	Third Battle of Nola	(Italy)	Marcellus fights an inconclusive battle with Hannibal.
214 BC	Battle of Beneventum	(Italy)	Tiberius Gracchus' slave legions defeat Hanno, son of Bomilcar and, therefore, deny Hannibal his reinforcements.
214 BC	Siege of Syracuse	(Italy)	The Roman general Marcellus' forces being kept at bay by the inventions of Archimedes.
212 BC	Battle of Tarentum	(Italy)	Hannibal defeats a Roman army in southern Italy, strengthening his situation in Italy.
212 BC	First Battle of Capua	(Italy)	Hannibal defeats the Consuls Q. Fulvius Flaccus and Appius Claudius, but the Roman army escapes.
212 BC	Battle of Beneventum	(Italy)	Quintus Fulvius Flaccus defeats Hanno (son of Bomilcar) in Southern Italy.
212 BC	Battle of the Silarus	(Italy)	Hannibal destroys the army of the Roman praetor M. Centenius Penula.
212 BC	Battle of Herdonia	(Italy)	Hannibal destroys the Roman army of the praetor Gnaeus Fulvius.
211 BC	Battle of the Upper Baetis	(Spain)	Publius and Gnaeus Cornelius Scipio are killed in battle with the Carthaginians under Hannibal's brother Hasdrubal Barca.
211 BC	Second Battle of Capua	(Italy)	Hannibal is unable to break the Roman siege of the city.
211 BC	Siege of Sardis (211 BC)	(Turkey)	Seleucid Empire defeats and executes the usurper Achaeus.
210 BC	Second Battle of Herdonia	(Italy)	Hannibal destroys the Roman army of Fulvius Centumalus, who is killed.
210 BC	Battle of Numistro	(Italy)	Hannibal defeats Marcellus once more.
209 BC	First Battle of Lamia	(Greece)	Philip V of Macedon defeats an Aetolian force under Phyrrhias.
209 BC	Second Battle of Lamia	(Greece)	Philip V of Macedon again defeats Phyrrhias.
209 BC	Battle of Asculum	(Italy)	Hannibal once again defeats Marcellus, in an indecisive battle.
209 BC	Battle of Tarentum	(Italy)	Quintus Fabius Maximus defeats Hannibal's forces.
209 BC	Battle of Mount Labus	(Iran)	Seleucids defeat and subjugate the Parthians
208 BC	Battle of Baecula	(Spain)	The Romans in Spain under P. Cornelius Scipio the Younger defeat Hasdrubal Barca.
208 BC	Siege of Bactra	(Afghanistan)	The Seleucid Empire defeats the Greco-Bactrians under Euthydemus.
208 BC	Battle of the Arius	(Afghanistan)	Antiochus III defeats the Greco-Bactrians.
207 BC	Battle of Grumentum	(Italy)	The Roman general Gaius Claudius Nero fights an indecisive battle with Hannibal, then escapes north to confront Hannibal's brother Hasdrubal Barca, who has invaded Italy.
207 BC	Battle of Julu	(China)	Xiang Yu destroys the main Qin army for control of China.
207 BC	Battle of the Metaurus	(Italy)	Hasdrubal is defeated and killed by Nero's Roman army.
207 BC	Battle of Cartagena	(Spain)	Scipio Africanus Major destroys the Catharginian city of Cartagena in Iberia.
207 BC	Battle of Mantinea	(Greece)	Philopoemen of the Achaean League defeats the Spartans under Machanidas, who is killed.
206 BC	Battle of Ilipa	(Spain)	Scipio again decisively defeats the remaining Carthaginian forces in Spain.
205 BC	Battle of Pengcheng	(China)	Chu defeats Han under Liu Bang.
205 BC	Battle of Anyi	(China)	Han defeats Wei.
205 BC	Battle of Jingxing	(China)	Han Xin, with an army of 30,000 levies, defeats a numerically larger army of the Zhao near Jingxing (Jing Gorge), killing Chen Yu and capturing Zhao Xie, the Prince of Zhao.
204 BC	Battle of Crotona	(Italy)	Hannibal fights a drawn battle against the Roman general Sempronius in Southern Italy.
204 BC	Battle of Utica	(Tunisia)	Scipio Africanus fights the Carthaginians and Numidians, ending in a draw.
204 BC	Battle of Wei River	(China)	Han Xin defeats a joint Qi and Western Chu army by building a temporary dam, luring his enemies into the river, and opening the dam to drown them.
203 BC	Battle of Utica	(Tunisia)	Publius Cornelius Scipio decisively defeats Carthage under Hasdrubal.
203 BC	Battle of the Great Plains	(Tunisia)	The Romans under Scipio defeat the Carthaginian army of Hasdrubal Gisco and Syphax. Hannibal is sent to return to Africa.
203 BC	Battle of Cirta	(Algeria)	Roman forces sack the Numidian capital, decisively defeating Carthage's ally.
203 BC	Po Valley Raid	(Italy)	Roman forces under Varus and Cethegus defeat Mago of Carthage, ending the Second Punic War in Italy.
203 BC	Battle of Gaixia	(China)	The Han forces led by Liu Bang, who was later to become Emperor of China, defeats their Chu opponents.
202 BC	Battle of Zama	(Tunisia)	Scipio Africanus Major decisively defeats Hannibal in North Africa, ending the Second Punic War.
201 BC	Battle of Chios	(Greece)	Philip V of Macedon is defeated at sea by the Rhodians and Pergamenes.
201 BC	Battle of Lade	(Turkey)	Philip V of Macedon defeats Cleonaeus of Rhodes in a naval battle.
200 BC	Battle of Cremona	(Italy)	Roman forces defeat the Gauls of Cisalpine Gaul.
200 BC	Battle of Baideng	(China)	The army of Han China, attempting to conquer the Xiongnu people living to the north, is defeated and the Chinese Emperor is almost captured.
200 BC	Battle of Panium	(Israel) or (Syria)	Antiochus III the Great secures the conquest of Syria and Israel from Egypt with this victory.

== 2nd century BC ==
Year	Battle	Loc.	Description
198 BC	Battle of the Aous	(Albania)	Roman forces under Titus Quinctius Flamininus defeat the Macedonians under Philip V.
197 BC	Battle of Cynoscephalae	(Greece)	Romans under Flamininus decisively defeat Philip in Thessaly.
195 BC	Siege of Gythium	(Greece)	With assistance from Rome, Rhodes, and Macedon, Philopoemen of the Achaean League defeat the Spartans under Nabis.
195 BC	Siege of Sparta	(Greece)	Romans and Achaeans occupy Sparta
194 BC	Battle of Placentia	(Italy)	Romans defeat Gauls.
193 BC	Battle of Mutina	(Italy)	Roman victory over the Gauls, final Roman conquest of the Boii tribe.
191 BC	Battle of Thermopylae	(Greece)	Romans under Manius Acilius Glabrio defeat Antiochus III the Great and force him to evacuate Greece.
191 BC	Battle of Corycus	(Turkey)	Romans defeat the Seleucids at sea
190 BC	Battle of the Eurymedon	(Turkey)	Roman forces under Lucius Aemilius Regillus defeat a Seleucid fleet commanded by Hannibal, fighting his last battle.
190 BC	Battle of Myonessus	(Turkey)	Another Seleucid fleet is defeated by the Romans.
190 BC	Battle of Magnesia	(Turkey)	December – Romans under Lucius Cornelius Scipio and his brother Scipio Africanus Major defeat Antiochus III the Great in the decisive victory of the war.
189 BC	Battle of Mount Olympus	(Turkey)	Roman and Pergamum forces crushingly defeat the Galatians.
189 BC	Battle of Ancyra	(Turkey)	Rome once again defeats Galatians.
181 BC	Battle of Manlian Pass	(Spain)	Romans defeat Celtiberians
181 BC	Siege of Aebura	(Spain)	Romans take city from Celtiberians during the First Celtiberian War
180 BC	Battle of Kali Sindhu	(India)	Indian Shunga Empire defeats Greco-Bactrians under Demetrius I near the Kali Sindh River.
171 BC	Battle of Callicinus	(Greece)	Perseus of Macedon defeats a Roman army under Publius Licinius Crassus.
169 BC	Siege of Eucratideia	(Afghanistan)	Stalemate between the Indo-Greek Kingdom and the Greco-Bactrian Kingdom.
168 BC	Battle of Pydna	(Greece)	22 June – Romans under Lucius Aemilius Paullus Macedonicus defeat and capture Macedonian King Perseus, ending the Third Macedonian War and annexing Macedon for Rome.
168 BC	Siege of Bassania	(Albania)	Illyrians take the allied Roman city of Bassania.
167 BC	Battle of Wadi Haramia	(Palestine)	Jewish rebels under Judas Maccabaeus deal a serious blow to the Seleucids, killing their leader Apollonius.
166 BC	Battle of Beth Horon (166 BC)	(Palestine)	The Jewish rebel leader Judas Maccabaeus defeats the Seleucids.
166 BC	Battle of Emmaus	(Israel)	Judas Maccabeus again defeats the Seleucids.
164 BC	Battle of Beth Zur	(Palestine)	Another victory of Judas Maccabaeus over the Seleucids, leading to the recapture of Jerusalem by the rebels.
162 BC	Battle of Beth Zachariah	(Palestine)	The Seleucid regent Lysias defeats the Jewish rebels.
162 BC	Battle of Vijithapura	(Sri Lanka)	Sri Lankan King Dutthagamani defeats encroaching South Indian King Ellalan.
161 BC	Battle of Adasa	(Palestine)	In his last victory, Judas Maccabaeus defeats and kills the Seleucid general Nicanor.
160 BC	Battle of Elasa	(Palestine)	Jewish leader Judas Maccabaeus is defeated and killed by the Seleucid army of Bacchides.
154 BC	Siege of Lapethus	(Cyprus)	Ptolemy VIII besieged and captured by his older brother Ptolemy VI in Lapethus, Cyprus.
151 BC	Battle of Oroscopa	(Tunisia)	Carthaginian expedition against Numidia is defeated. Rome would later use this as an excuse to begin the Third Punic War
c. 150 BC	Battle of Vidarbha	(India)	Shunga Empire under Agnimitra annexes Vidarbha
149 BC	Battle of Lake Tunis	(Tunisia)	Carthage defeats Roman advance.
148 BC	Battle of Pydna	(Greece)	The forces of the Macedonian pretender Andriscus are defeated by the Romans under Quintus Caecilius Metellus Macedonicus in the decisive engagement of the Fourth Macedonian War.
147 BC	Battle of the Port of Carthage	(Tunisia)	Carthage has small victory over Roman navy, but not enough to break the Roman blockade or advancement.
147 BC	Battle of Nepheris	(Tunisia)	Rome advances further on Carthage, defeating their army.
146 BC	Battle of Carthage (c.149 BC)	(Tunisia)	Scipio Africanus Minor captures and destroys Carthage, ending the Third Punic War.
146 BC	Battle of Scarpheia	(Greece)	Romans defeat the Achaean League forces of Critolaus, who is killed.
146 BC	Battle of Corinth	(Greece)	Achaean last stand against Romans under Lucius Mummius fails. Greece comes under direct Roman rule.
145 BC	Battle of the Oenoparus	(Turkey)	Ptolemy VI Philometor defeats the Seleucid usurper Alexander Balas, but is killed in the fighting.
145 BC	Battle of Vidarbha	(India)	Shunga Empire under King Agnimitra defeat the Vidarbha Kingdom.
138 BC	Siege of Dong'ou	(China)	Minyue nearly defeat the Kingdom of Dong'ou until the Han intervene to repel Minyue, Dong'ou submits to the Han Dynasty afterwards.
135 BC	Battle on the Sindhu River	(India)	Shunga Empire defeats Indo-Greek Kingdom.
133 BC	Siege of Numantia	(Spain)	Roman forces under Scipio Aemilianus defeat the Celtiberians and sack their capital city.
133 BC	Battle of Mayi	(China)	Aborted ambush mission by the Han against invading Xiongnu forces.
129 BC	Battle of Ecbatana	(Iran)	The Seleucid King Antiochus VII Sidetes is defeated and killed by the Parthians under Phraates II, ending any pretense of Seleucid control over Media or Mesopotamia.
121 BC	Battle of Vindalium	(France)	Romans defeat the Allobroges
121 BC	Battle of the Isère River	(France)	Romans defeat a large Gallic army and take over Gallia Narbonensis
119 BC	Battle of Mobei	(Mongolia)	Han forces decisively defeat the Xiongnu army in the Gobi Desert, more than 90,000 Xiongnus killed.
113 BC	Siege of Cirta	(Algeria)	Jugurtha defeats Adherbal and takes over all of Numidia
112 BC	Battle of Noreia	(Austria)	Cimbrian victory against Rome during the Cimbrian War.
110 BC	Battle of Suthul	(Algeria)	Numidian victory in the Jugurthine War
110 BC	Siege of Chersonesos	(Ukraine) (Russia)	Pontus under Diophantus defeats attempted siege by Crimean Scythians under Palacus and Roxolani under Tasius in the Crimea.
109 BC	Battle of the Muthul	(Tunisia)	Roman forces under Caecilius Metellus defeat the forces of Jugurtha of Numidia.
109 BC	Siege of Zama	(Tunisia)	Rome besieges Zama
108 BC	Battle of Loulan	(China)	Han forces defeat Loulan Kingdom.
108 BC	Siege of Thala	(Tunisia)	Rome besieges Thala
107 BC	Battle of Burdigala	(France)	Alliance of Germanic and Celtic tribes led by Divico defeat the Romans and kill Lucius Cassius Longinus and Lucius Calpurnius Piso Caesoninus.
106 BC	Second Battle of Cirta	(Algeria)	Gaius Marius defeats Numidia and Mauretania and captures Cirta
105 BC	Battle of Arausio	(France)	6 October – Cimbri inflict a major defeat on the Roman army of Gnaeus Mallius Maximus.
103 BC	Battle of Scirthaea	(Italy)	Praetor Lucius Licinius Lucullus defeats the slave army of Salvius Tryphon in an open field.
103 BC	Siege of Triocala	(Italy)	Lucullus besieges the slave stronghold but ends the siege after finding out he had been replaced.
103 BC	Battle of Asophon	(Israel)	Pharaoh Ptolemy IX Soter defeats Alexander Jannaeus of the Hasmonean Kingdom then plunders Judea.
102 BC	Battle of Tridentum	(Italy)	Rome has a tactical withdrawal from combat with the Cimbri.
102 BC	Battle of Aquae Sextiae	(France)	The Romans under Gaius Marius defeat the Teutons.
101 BC	Battle of Vercellae	(Italy)	The Romans under Marius defeat the Cimbri, who are entirely annihilated.

== 1st century BC ==
Year	Battle	Loc.	Description
99 BC	Battle of Tian Shan	(China) or (Kazakhstan)	Xiongnu defeat Han dynasty.
93 BC	Battle of Gadara	(Jordan)	Nabataean Kingdom under Obodas I ambush and defeat Hasmonean Kingdom under Alexander Jannaeus in the Transjordan.
91 BC	Battle of Mount Falernus	(Italy)	Romans defeated during the Social War
90 BC	Battle of Aesernia	(Italy)	Romans under Lucius Julius Caesar (consul 90 BC) defeated by Italian rebels during the Social War.
90 BC	Battle of Acerrae	(Italy)	Romans defeat Italians rebels led by Gaius Papius Mutilus during the Social War.
89 BC	Battle of Fucine Lake	(Italy)	Roman forces under Lucius Porcius Cato are defeated by the Italian rebels in the Social War.
89 BC	Battle of Asculum	(Italy)	The Roman army of C. Pompeius Strabo decisively defeats the rebels in the Social War.
89 BC	Battle of the Aufidus	(Italy)	Romans defeat Samnite army
89 BC	Battle of the River Amnias	(Turkey)	Mithridatic forces defeat Nicomedes IV of Bithynia.
89 BC	Battle of Protopachium	(Turkey)	Mithridates decisively defeats a Roman army and occupies Asia Minor
88 BC	Battle of Mount Scorobas	(Turkey)	Mithridatic forces under Archelaus defeat the Romans under Manius Aquilius.
87 – 86 BC	Siege of Athens and Piraeus	(Greece)	Lucius Cornelius Sulla defeats the combined forces of Athens and Pontus at Athens.
86 BC	Battle of Tenedos	(Turkey)	Naval victory for Lucius Licinius Lucullus during the First Mithridatic War.
86 BC	Battle of Chaeronea	(Greece)	The Roman forces of Lucius Cornelius Sulla defeat the Pontic forces of Archelaus in the First Mithridatic War.
85 BC	Battle of Orchomenus	(Greece)	Sulla again defeats Archelaus in the decisive battle of the First Mithridatic War.
84 BC	Battle of Cana	(Israel) or (Jordan)	Nabataean Kingdom under Obodas I defeats the Seleucid Empire and kills their king Antiochus XII Dionysus.
83 BC	Battle of Mount Tifata	(Italy)	Sulla defeats the Popular forces of Caius Norbanus in the First Roman Civil War.
82 BC	Battle of Sacriportus	(Italy)	Sulla defeats army of Gaius Marius the Younger
82 BC	Battle of the Colline Gate	(Italy)	November – Sulla defeats Samnites allied to the Popular party in Rome in the decisive battle of the Civil War.
80 BC	Battle of the Baetis River	(Spain)	Rebel forces under Quintus Sertorius defeat the legal Roman forces of Lucius Fulfidias in Spain.
76 BC	Battle of Lauron	(Spain)	Sertorius defeats the army of Pompey
75 BC	Battle of Saguntum	(Spain)	Last pitched battle in the Sertorian War
74 BC	Battle of Chalcedon	(Turkey)	Mithridates VI of Pontus defeats Romans under Marcus Aerelius Cotta.
73 BC	Battle of Mount Vesuvius	(Italy)	Slave army under Spartacus defeats Romans under Gaius Claudius Glaber.
73 BC	Battle of Cyzicus	(Turkey)	Roman forces under Lucius Lucullus inflict a heavy defeat on the forces of Mithridates VI of Pontus.
73 BC	Battle of the Rhyndacus (73 BC)	(Turkey)	Romans under Lucullus defeat Mithridates again.
73 BC	Battle of Lemnos	(Greece)	Roman fleet defeats Pontic fleet
72 BC	Battle of Cabira	(Turkey)	Lucullus again defeats Mithridates, overrunning Pontus.
72-71 BC	Siege of Heraclea	(Turkey)	Romans capture Heraclea Pontica
72-69 BC	Siege of Knossos	(Greece)	Romans capture Crete
71 BC	Battle of Cantenna	(Italy)	Romans under Marcus Licinius Crassus defeat slave armies, killing their leaders Gannicus and Castus.
71 BC	Battle of the Silarius River	(Italy)	Roman forces led by Marcus Licinius Crassus decisively defeat the slave army of Spartacus, who dies in the battle. End of the Servile Wars.
69 BC	Battle of Tigranocerta	(Turkey)	Lucullus defeats the army of Tigranes II of Armenia, who was harboring his father-in-law Mithridates VI of Pontus.
68 BC	Battle of Artaxata	(Armenia)	Lucullus again defeats Tigranes.
67 BC	Battle of Korakesion	(Turkey)	Naval battle between pirates and Pompey's Fleet, ending in a decisive victory against piracy in the Mediterranean.
67 BC	Battle of Jushi	(China)	Han troops defeat the Xiongnu, seizing the city of Jiaohe.
67 BC	Battle of Zela (67 BC)	(Turkey)	Mithridates VI retakes his kingdom from Rome
66 BC	Battle of the Lycus	(Turkey)	Pompey the Great decisively defeats Mithridates VI, effectively ending the Third Mithridatic War.
65 BC	Battle of the Pelorus	(Georgia (country))	Pompey defeats the Iberians
65 BC	Battle of the Abas	(Azerbaijan)	Pompey defeats the Albanians
63 BC	Battle of Magetobriga	(France)	The Gallic Sequani and Averni tribes and Germanic Suebi tribe led by Ariovistus defeat the Gallic Aedui tribe, which appeals to the Roman Senate for aid, which becomes a basis which leads to the Gallic Wars.
63 BC	Siege of Jerusalem	(Palestine)	Romans under Pompey defeat the Hasmonean Kingdom and incorporate Judea into the Roman Republic.
62 BC	Battle of Pistoria	(Italy)	January – The forces of the conspirator Catiline are defeated by the loyal Roman armies under Gaius Antonius.
61 BC	Battle of Histria	(Romania)	Bastarnae and Scythians defeat the Roman consul Gaius Antonius Hybrida.
58 BC	Battle of the Arar	(France)	June – Caesar defeats the migrating Helvetii.
58 BC	Battle of Bibracte	(France)	July – Caesar again defeats the Helvetii, this time decisively.
58 BC	Battle of Vosges	(France)	Caesar decisively defeats the forces of the Germanic chieftain Ariovistus near modern Belfort.
57 BC	Battle of the Axona	(France)	Caesar defeats the forces of the Belgae under King Galba of Suessiones.
57 BC	Battle of the Sabis	(France)	Caesar defeats the Nervii.
57 BC	Siege of the Atuatuci	(Belgium)	Caesar conquers the Atuatuci in modern-day Belgium after sieging their capital. 4,000 were killed and the rest sold into slavery.
57-56 BC	Battle of Octodurus	(Switzerland)	Rome under Servius Sulpicius Galba defeats the Seduni and Veragri tribes of Switzerland, but the ferocity of the battle led to the legion subsequently moving out of the Alps.
53 BC	Battle of Carrhae	(Turkey)	The Roman Triumvir Crassus is defeated and killed by the Parthians.
52 BC	Battle of Bovillae	(Italy)	The gangs of Clodius and Milo clash surprisingly, leading to the death of Clodius.
52 BC	Siege of Avaricum	(France)	Julius Caesar defeats Vercingetorix.
52 BC	Battle of Gergovia	(France)	Caesar is defeated by the Gallic leader Vercingetorix.
52 BC	Battle of Lutetia	(France)	Romans under Titus Labienus defeat Gauls under Camulogene
52 BC	Battle of Alesia	(France)	Caesar defeats Vercingetorix, completing the Roman conquest of Transalpine Gaul.
51 BC	Siege of Uxellodunum	(France)	Caesar destroys the last Gallic tribes resisting Rome
49 BC	Siege of Corfinium	(Italy)	Caesar captures town of Corfinium on way to catch Pompey in Southern Italy. First Major engagement in Caesar's Civil War
49 BC	Siege of Brundisium	(Italy)	Caesar captures port town of Brundisium on the Adriatic Sea. He fails to catch Pompey, who escapes to Greece.
49 BC	Siege of Massilia	(France)	Caesar besieges and captures Massilia, resulting in the absorption of the city into the Republic.
49 BC	Battle of Ilerda	(Spain)	Caesar defeats the Spanish army of Pompey under Lucius Afranius and Marcus Petreius.
49 BC	Battle of Tauroento	(France)	Caesar's fleet blockading Massilia under Decimus Junius Brutus Albinus defeat the Massilian fleet and a reinforcing pompeian one under Lucius Domitius Ahenobarbus and Quintus Nasidius in a naval battle, in which the Massilian fleet is destroyed and the Pompeians retreat.
49 BC	Siege of Curicta	(Croatia)	Pompeians under Lucius Scribonius Libo and Marcus Octavius defeat a naval force and starve the Caesarian army under Gaius Antonius and Publius Cornelius Dolabella, both of whom are captured.
49 BC	Battle of Utica (49 BC)	(Tunisia)	Gaius Scribonius Curio defeats the Numidians in North Africa, cutting off supplies to Attius Varus.
49 BC	Battle of the Bagradas River	(Tunisia)	24 August – Caesar's general Gaius Curio is defeated in North Africa by the Pompeians under Attius Varus and King Juba I of Numidia. Curio is killed in battle.
49 BC	Siege of Salona (49)	(Croatia)	Caesarians in Salona repel an assault by the Pompeians under Marcus Octavius.
48 BC	Battle of Dyrrhachium (48 BC)	(Albania)	10 July – Caesar barely avoids a catastrophic defeat to Pompey in Macedonia.
48 BC	Siege of Oricum	(Albania)	Caesar captures Oricum
48 BC	Siege of Gomphi	(Greece)	Caesar captures town of Gomphi after they refuse to open their gates.
48 BC	Battle of Pharsalus	(Greece)	Julius Caesar decisively defeats Pompey, who flees to Egypt.
48 BC	Battle of Nicopolis (48 BC)	(Turkey)	Pharnaces II of Pontus decisively defeats a Roman army under Calvinus.
47 BC	Siege of Alexandria (47 BC)	(Egypt)	Ptolemy XIII lays an unsuccessful siege on Alexandria to defeat Caesar and his sister Cleopatra VII.
47 BC	Battle of the Nile	(Egypt)	February – Caesar defeats the forces of the Egyptian king Ptolemy XIII.
47 BC	Battle of Zela	(Turkey)	August – Caesar defeats Pharnaces II of Pontus. This is the battle where he famously said Veni, vidi, vici. (I came, I saw, I conquered.).
47 BC	Battle of Tauris	(Croatia)	Publius Vatinius defeats Pompeian fleet under Marcus Octavius raiding off the coast of Dalmatia.
46 BC	Battle of Ruspina	(Tunisia)	4 January – Caesar loses perhaps as much as a third of his army to Titus Labienus.
46 BC	Battle of Ascurum	(Algeria) or (Morocco)	Pompey the Younger is defeated by the Mauretanians
46 BC	Battle of Thapsus	(Tunisia)	6 February – Caesar defeats the Pompeian army of Metellus Scipio in North Africa.
46 BC	Battle of Hippo Regius	(Algeria)	Pompeian fleet of Scipio destroyed by Publius Sittius
46 BC	Battle of Carteia	(Spain)	Pompeian fleet of Attius Varus destroyed
45 BC	Battle of Munda	(Spain)	17 March – In his last victory, Caesar defeats the Pompeian forces of Titus Labienus and Gnaeus Pompey the Younger in Spain. Labienus is killed in the battle
45 BC	Battle of Lauro	(Spain)	Pompey the Younger is captured and executed by Luciuis Caesennius Lento
45 BC	Siege of Corduba	(Spain)	Caesar captures city of Corduba from Sextus Pompey
45 BC	Siege of Apamea	(Syria)	Caesars supporters fail to capture Pompeian town of Apamea in Syria.
43 BC	Battle of Forum Gallorum	(Italy)	14 April – Antony, besieging Caesar's assassin Decimus Brutus in Mutina, defeats the forces of the consul Pansa, who is killed, but is then immediately defeated by the army of the other consul, Hirtius
43 BC	Battle of Mutina	(Italy)	21 April – Antony is again defeated in battle by Hirtius, who is killed. Although Antony fails to capture Mutina, Decimus Brutus is murdered shortly thereafter.
42 BC	First Battle of Philippi	(Greece)	3 October – The Triumvirs Mark Antony and Octavian fight an indecisive battle with Caesar's assassins Marcus Brutus and Cassius. Although Brutus defeats Octavian, Antony defeats Cassius, who commits suicide.
42 BC	Second Battle of Philippi	(Greece)	23 October – Brutus's army is decisively defeated by Antony and Octavian. Brutus escapes, but commits suicide soon after.
40 BC	Battle of Perugia	(Italy)	Mark Antony's brother Lucius Antonius and Mark Anthony's wife Fulvia are defeated by Octavian. Fulvia is exiled.
39 BC	Battle of the Cilician Gates	(Turkey)	Publius Ventidius Bassus inflicts a decisive defeat on a joint Parthian-Pompeian invasion force, which results in their retreat, the capture and execution of the Pompeian leader Quintus Labienus and the re-absorption of his soldiers back into the Roman Army.
39 BC	Battle of Amanus Pass	(Turkey)	Bassus again decisively vanquishes the Parthians, forcing them out of the Roman East and beginning to restore Roman rule to Syria and Judaea.
38 BC	Battle of Mount Gindarus	(Syria)	Bassus completes a trilogy of victories over the Parthians by crushing and turning back a new Parthian invasion led by Pacorus, son of King Orodes, with Pacorus being killed in the battle.
37 BC	Siege of Jerusalem	(Palestine)	With Roman assistance, Herod the Great defeats Antigonus II Mattathias and ends the Hasmonean Kingdom.
36 BC	Battle of Naulochus	(Italy)	Octavian's fleet, under the command of Marcus Vipsanius Agrippa defeats the forces of Sextus Pompey.
36 BC	Battle of Zhizhi	(Kazakhstan)	Han forces defeat the Xiongnu and kill their chieftain Zhizhi.
31 BC	Battle of Actium	(Greece)	2 September – Octavian decisively defeats Antony and Cleopatra in a naval battle near Greece
30 BC	Battle of Alexandria	(Egypt)	31 July – Mark Antony achieves a minor victory over Octavian's forces, but most of his army subsequently deserts, leading to his suicide.
25 BC	Siege of Aracillum	(Spain)	Romans defeat the Cantabri in northern Spain.
25 BC	Battle of Vellica	(Spain)	Romans led by Emperor Augustus defeat the Cantabri.
25 BC	Siege of Marib	(Yemen)	Sheba decisively defeats an exhausted army of Romans and Nabateans led by Aelius Gallus in Marib, forcing them to retreat and call off their invasion of Arabia.
23 BC	Siege of Napata	(Sudan)	Romans siege and raze the Kushite city of Napata in Nubia to stop attacks from Queen Amanirenas.
15 BC	Battle of Lake Constance	(Germany) , (Switzerland) or (Austria)	Small naval battle between Romans under the future emperor Tiberius and Celtic tribes on Lake Constance in the Northern Alps.
11 BC	Battle of Arbalo	(Germany)	Romans under Drusus defeat the Germanic tribes.
11 BC	Battle of the Lupia River	(Germany)	Roman forces under Augustus's stepson Drusus win a victory in Germany.

== 1st century ==
Year	Battle	Loc.	Description
9	Battle of the Teutoburg Forest	(Germany)	The German leader Arminius destroys the Roman legions of Publius Quinctilius Varus.
15	Battle at Pontes Longi	(Germany)	Inconclusive battle between Rome and Germanic tribes.
16	Battle of the Weser River	(Germany)	Legions under Germanicus defeat German tribes of Arminius.
16	Battle of the Angrivarian Wall	(Germany)	Legions under Germanicus again defeat German tribes under Arminius.
23	Battle of Kunyang	(China)	After being sieged for 2 months, 9,000 insurgents under Liu Xiu defeat 450,000 of Wang Mang's troops, ushering in the fall of Wang Mang and restoration of the Han dynasty.
28	Battle of Baduhenna Wood	(Netherlands)	After a stalemate battle with the Frisii, Romans withdraw from northern Holland.
43	Battle of the Medway	(United Kingdom)	Claudius and general Aulus Plautius defeat a confederation of British Celtic tribes. Roman invasion of Britain begins.
49	Siege of Uspe	(Russia)	Rome-allied Aorsi defeat the Siraces, Roman–Bosporan War ends soon after.
50	Battle of Caer Caradock	(United Kingdom)	The British chieftain Caractacus is defeated and captured by the Romans under Ostorius Scapula.
58	Salt Battle	(Germany)	Germanic Hermunduri tribe defeat Germanic Chatti tribe over control of the Main River.
60-61	Battle of Camulodunum	(United Kingdom)	A British horde led by Boudica crushes most of the IX Legion under Quintus Petillius Cerialis.
61	Battle of Watling Street	(United Kingdom)	The uprising of the British queen Boudica against the Romans is defeated by Suetonius Paullinus.
61	Siege of Tigranocerta	(Turkey)	Parthians siege Roman city until truce agreed to, said truce was extremely brief.
62	Battle of Rhandeia	(Turkey)	Romans under Lucius Caesennius Paetus are defeated by a Parthian-Armenian army under King Tiridates of Parthia.
66	Battle of Beth Horon (66)	(Palestine)	Jewish rebels defeat a Roman legion, bringing about one of Rome's most severe defeats against rebels in their history.
67	Siege of Yodfat	(Israel)	Roman forces under Vespasianus and Titus sack Yodfat after 47 days, killing most of its inhabitants and enslaving the rest.
67	Siege of Gamla	(Syria)	City of Gamla besieged by Rome during the First Jewish-Roman War.
68	Battle of Vensontio	(France)	Governor of Germania Superior Lucius Verginius Rufus defeats the rebellion of Gaius Julius Vindex
69	Battle of Bedriacum	(Italy)	14 April – Vitellius, commander of the Rhine armies, defeats Emperor Otho and seizes the throne.
69	Second Battle of Bedriacum	(Italy)	24 October – Forces under Antonius Primus, the commander of the Danube armies loyal to Vespasian, defeat the forces of Emperor Vitellius.
69	Battle of Locus Castorum	(Italy)	Armies of Emperors Otho and Vitellius clash in northern Italy, ending in victory for Otho's forces.
70	Siege of Jerusalem (70)	(Palestine)	Titus lays siege to Jerusalem for 7 months, killing tens of thousands of Jews and destroying the Second Temple of Jerusalem.
71	Battle of Stanwick	(United Kingdom)	Roman forces defeat the Brigantes.
73	Battle of Yiwulu	(China)	Part of an expedition against the Xiongnu, ending in Han victory.
74	Siege of Masada	(Israel)	Final Roman defeat of Jewish Sicarii rebels.
84	Battle of Mons Graupius	(United Kingdom)	The Romans under Agricola defeat the Caledonians.
87-88	First Battle of Tapae	(Romania)	Battle between the Roman emperor Domitian and the Kingdom of Dacia.
89	Battle of the Altai Mountains	(China) , (Mongolia) or (Kazakhstan)	June - Part of an expedition against the Xiongnu, decisive Han victory with massive numbers of prisoners taken. Collapse of Xiongnu Empire.
90	Siege of Shule	(China)	Han dynasty under Ban Chao repels siege by larger army of Kushan Empire.

== 2nd century ==
Year	Battle	Loc.	Description
101	Second Battle of Tapae	(Romania)	Trajan defeats Decebalus, ending Trajan's Dacian Wars.
102	Battle of Adamclisi	(Romania)	Trajan defeats Dacians, Roxolani, & Bastarnae in modern Romania.
103	Battle of Gatae	?	Trajan defeats Dacians.
106	Battle of Sarmizegetusa	(Romania)	Trajan victorious in the siege of the Dacian capital of Sarmizegetusa.
116	Battle of Ctesiphon	(Iraq)	Trajan captures the Parthian capital of Ctesiphon.
117	Siege of Hatra	(Iraq)	Trajan withdraws from siege on Hatra.
130	Battle of Venni	(India)	Cholas led by Karikala defeats confederacy of Pandya and Chera rulers.
140	Siege of Burnswark	(United Kingdom)	Romans defeat Selgovae in southern Scotland.
163	Siege of Edessa	(Turkey)	Parthians take city of Edessa from Rome.
165	Siege of Edessa	(Turkey)	Romans retake city and massacre Parthian garrison.
165	Battle of Ctesiphon	(Iraq)	Romans under Avidius Cassius defeat the Parthians, further weakening their Empire.
170	Battle of Carnuntum	(Austria)	Romans under Marcus Aurelius defeated by Marcomanni under Ballomar and their allies the Quadi tribe.
184	Battle of Yingchuan	(China)	April - Han Dynasty forces defeat Yellow Turban Army in turning point of the Yellow Turban Rebellion.
184	Siege of Julu	(China)	June - Han Dynasty under Huangfu Song defeats the Yellow Turban Army led by Zhang Jue.
190	Battle of Xingyang	(China)	Dong Zhuo emerges victorious against Cao Cao.
190	Battle of Venni	(India)	Early Chola led by Karikala defeat a confederacy led by Pandya and Chera rulers.
191	Battle of Jieqiao	(China)	Yuan Shao's infantry repulses a cavalry charge by rival warlord Gongsun Zan.
191	Battle of Yangcheng	(China)	Yuan Shao was beaten back by Sun Jian.
191	Battle of Xiangyang	(China)	Liu Biao emerges victorious against Sun Jian
192	Battle of Chang'an	(China)	Forces led by Li Jue and Guo Si defeat the assassins of Dong Zhuo, Wang Yun and Lü Bu. Wang Yun captured and executed.
193	Battle of Cyzicus	(Turkey)	Septimius Severus, the new Emperor, defeats his eastern rival Pescennius Niger in the Year of the Five Emperors.
193	Battle of Nicaea	(Turkey)	Severus again defeats Niger.
193	Battle of Fengqiu	(China)	Cao Cao emerges victorious against Yuan Shu.
194	Battle of Issus	(Turkey)	Severus defeats Niger for the last time.
194	Battle of Yan Province	(China)	Cao Cao and Lü Bu battle for control of the region.
197	Battle of Lugdunum	(France)	19 February – Emperor Septimius Severus defeats and kills his rival Clodius Albinus, securing full control over the Empire.
197	Battle of Wancheng	(China)	Cao Cao flees after Zhang Xiu attacked.
198	Battle of Ctesiphon (198)	(Iraq)	Roman forces under Septimius Severus capture the Parthian capital, fatally weakening the Empire, leading to the rise of the Sassanids.
198	Siege of Hatra	(Iraq)	Romans under Septimius Severus unsuccessfully attack the Parthian vassal of Hatra.
198	Battle of Xiapi	(China)	Cao Cao and Liu Bei emerges victorious against Lü Bu.
199	Battle of Yijing	(China)	Yuan Shao emerges victorious against Gongsun Zan.
200	Battle of Guandu	(China)	Cao Cao defeats Yuan Shao's numerically superior army and secures domination of the North China plain.

== 3rd century ==
Year	Battle	Loc.	Description
202	Battle of Bowang	(China)	Liu Bei emerges victorious against Xiahou Dun.
203	Siege of Garama	(Libya)	Romans led by Emperor Septimius Severus capture Garama, the capital of the Garamantes but soon abandon it.
208	Battle of Xiakou	(China)	Sun Quan emerges victorious against Huang Zu.
208	Battle of Changban	(China)	Cao Cao's cavalry catch Liu Bei's forces, disperse his army, and capture most of his baggage train.
208	Battle of Red Cliffs	(China)	War of Three Kingdoms, Cao Cao failed to conquer lands of Sun Quan and Liu Bei.
208	Battle of Yiling	(China)	Sun Quan emerges victorious against Cao Cao.
209	Battle of Jiangling	(China)	Sun Quan & Liu Bei emerge victorious against Cao Cao.
211	Battle of Tong Pass	(China)	Cao Cao emerges victorious against Ma Chao.
213	Siege of Jicheng	(China)	Ma Chao emerges victorious against Cao Cao.
213	Battle of Lucheng	(China)	Yang Fu emerges victorious against Ma Chao.
215	Battle of Yangping	(China)	Cao Cao emerges victorious against Zhang Lu.
215	Battle of Baxi	(China)	Zhang Fei emerges victorious against Zhang He.
217	Battle of Nisibis	(Turkey)	Parthian troops under Artabanus IV battle the new Roman Emperor Macrinus in southern Turkey, ending in a draw.
217	Battle of Ruxu	(China)	Sun Quan emerges victorious against Cao Cao.
218	Battle of Antioch	(Turkey)	Varius Avitus defeats Emperor Macrinus to claim the throne under the name Elagabalus.
219	Battle of Mount Dingjun	(China)	Liu Bei emerges victorious against Cao Cao.
219	Battle of Han River	(China)	Liu Bei emerges victorious against Cao Cao.
219	Battle of Fancheng	(China)	Cao Ren emerges victorious against Guan Yu.
222	Battle of Xiaoting	(China)	Liu Bei's invasion of Wu is repulsed by Sun Quan's commander Lu Xun.
224	Battle of Hormizdegan	(Iran)	Sassanid forces defeat the Parthians, killing King Artabanus IV and ending Parthian rule in the Middle East.
c.226-227	Siege of Hatra	(Iraq)	Romans and Hatra repel the Sassanid's under Ardashir I's first attempt at taking Hatra.
228	Xincheng Rebellion	(China)	Sima Yi emerges victorious against Meng Da.
228	Battle of Tianshui	(China)	Shu emerges victorious against Wei.
228	Battle of Jieting	(China)	Part of the First Northern Expedition.
228	Battle of Shiting	(China)	Wu emerges victorious against Wei.
229	Siege of Chencang	(China)	Wei emerges victorious against Shu.
231	Battle of Mount Qi	(China)	Shu victory against Wei, but strategic defeat.
234	Battle of Wuzhang Plains	(China)	Part of the Fifth Northern Expedition, Zhuge Liang dies.
235	Siege of Nisbis	(Turkey)	Sassanids capture city.
235	Battle at the Harzhorn	(Germany)	Romans under Maximinus Thrax defeat Germanic tribes.
238	Battle of Carthage	(Tunisia)	Troops loyal to the Roman Emperor Maximinus Thrax defeat and kill the usurper Gordian II.
238	Siege of Aquileia	(Italy)	Senate has Maximinus Thrax killed and defeats his supporters.
240-241	Fall of Hatra	(Iraq)	Sassanids take city and annex the Kingdom of Hatra.
243	Battle of Resaena	(Syria)	Roman forces under Gordian III defeat the Persians under Shapur I. Gordian is either killed in battle or murdered before he can exploit his victory.
244	Battle of Misiche	(Iraq)	The Sassanids defeat Roman forces under Gordian III, who is subsequently killed.
244	Battle of Xingshi	(China)	Shu emerges victorious against Wei.
249	Battle of Verona	(Italy)	The usurper Decius defeats the army of the Emperor Philip the Arab and kills him in battle.
250	Battle of Philippopolis	(Bulgaria)	King Cuiva of the Goths defeats a Roman army.
250	Battle of Nicopolis	(Bulgaria)	Romans under Emperor Decius defeat Goths.
250	Battle of Beroe	(Bulgaria)	Goths defeat a Roman army
251	Battle of Abrittus	(Bulgaria)	The Goths defeat and kill the Roman Emperor Trajan Decius.
252	Siege of Nisibis	(Turkey)	Sassanids capture city.
253	Battle of Barbalissos	(Syria)	Sassanid forces under Shapur I defeat the Romans under Valerian, leading to their capture of Antioch.
253	Siege of Antioch	(Turkey)	Sassanids take city from Romans.
254	Battle of Thermopylae	(Greece)	Romans defeat advancing Goths.
255	Battle of Didao	(China)	Wei emerges victorious against Shu.
256	Siege of Dura-Europos	(Syria)	Sassanids defeat Romans in Syria.
259	Battle of Edessa	(Turkey)	King Shapur I of Persia defeats and captures the Roman Emperor Valerian.
259	Battle of Mediolanum	(Italy)	Emperor Gallienus defeats the Alamanni after their invasion of northern Italy, leading to the Romans retreating behind the Rhine.
260	Siege of Caeserea Cappadocia	(Turkey)	King Shapur I of Persia takes city from Romans.
263	Battle of Ctesiphon	(Iraq)	Sassanids under King Shapur repel siege by Palmyra under Odaenathus.
267	Battle of Thermopylae (267)	(Greece)	Roman forces unsuccessfully try to defend against the Heruli invasion of the Balkans.
267	Sack of Athens	(Greece)	Heruli ravage the Greek city and leave permanent damage to its monuments.
268	Battle of Lake Benacus	(Italy)	The Romans under Claudius II defeat the Alamanni.
269	Battle of Naissus	(Serbia)	Claudius II decisively defeats the Goths, earning the surname Gothicus.
269	Siege of Augustodunum Haeduorum	(France)	Victorinus claims the throne and defeats the forces of Emperor Claudius Gothicus.
270	Sack of Bostra	(Syria)	Zenobia of Palmyra takes Syria from Rome and drives out the Tanukhids.
271	Battle of Placentia	(Italy)	The Emperor Aurelian is defeated by the Alemanni forces invading Italy.
271	Battle of Fano	(Italy)	Aurelian defeats the Alemanni, who begin to retreat from Italy.
271	Battle of Pavia	(Italy)	Aurelian destroys the retreating Alemanni army.
272	Battle of Immae	(Syria)	Aurelian defeats the army of Zenobia of Palmyra.
272	Battle of Emesa	(Syria)	Aurelian decisively defeats Zenobia.
273	Battle of Palmyra	(Syria)	Romans fight a battle against the Palmyrene Empire and the Blemmyes.
274	Battle of Châlons	(France)	Aurelian defeats the Gallic usurper Tetricus, reestablishing central control of the whole empire.
285	Battle of the Margus	(Serbia)	The usurper Diocletian defeats the army of the Emperor Carinus, who is killed.
c.290	Battle of Shabwa	(Yemen)	Himyarites conquer the Kingdom of Hadhramaut and razes their capital of Shabwa.
296	Battle of Carrhae	(Syria) or (Turkey)	The Romans under the Caesar Galerius are defeated by the Persians under Narseh.
298	Battle of Satala	(Turkey)	The Romans under the Caesar Galerius rout the Persians under Narseh.
298	Battle of Lingones	(France)	The Caesar Constantius Chlorus defeats the Alemanni.
298	Battle of Vindonissa	(Switzerland)	Constantius again defeats the Alemanni.

== See also ==
- List of Roman battles
