= Siege of Bassania =

Part of the Third Illyrian war in 168 BCE

- Location of Ancient Bassania
Date	168 BC
Location	Bassania
Result	Illyrian victory
Territorial changes	Bassania captured by Gentius forces

Belligerents
Illyrian Kingdom	Roman Empire

Commanders and leaders
Gentius	Algalsus; Epicadus

Strength
15,000	Unknown number of soldiers 80 ships

Casualties and losses
Unknown	Unknown

The siege of Bassania is a battle that took place between King Gentius and the Roman allied city Bassania in the Third Illyrian War.

== Prelude ==
After the peace treaty between Gentius and Perdicass of Macedon, Gentius declared war on Rome. One of the main cities in Illyria allied to Rome was Bassania, which was said to be three times the size of ancient Shkodra, King Gentius' capital. This significant size gave Bassania immense influence in the region. Because of its loyalty to Rome, Gentius was forced to act quickly to bring the city under his control. In early spring, Anicius arrived in Illyria to continue the war against Gentius.

== Siege ==
Little is known about the siege of Bassania. It is documented that Gentius led 15,000 of his men to Bassania. The inhabitants chose to endure a siege rather than surrender to the Labeatae forces, despite Gentius offering them the opportunity to do so. As a result, the offensive prompted the Roman forces to take action. Two Roman generals, Algalsus and Epicadus, stationed in southern Illyria, planned to march on Gentius with their forces from the Parthini to region in order to lift the siege. However, the Romans abandoned this strategy when they learned that 80 ships were positioned to attack the coast. Gentius, on the advice of Pantauchus, sent these ships to ravage the fields of Apollonia and Dyrrhachium.

== Aftermath ==
With the need to prioritize coastal defense, the Romans were unable to respond to the siege. As a result, without the support of the Roman Republic, Bassania was defeated and eventually fell to Gentius.
