= Mago II of Carthage =

Shofet of Carthage from 396 BCE to 375 BCE

Mago II
- Shofet of Carthage
- Reign: 396 to 375 BCE
- Predecessor: Himilco II of Carthage
- Successor: Mago III of Carthage
- Dynasty: Magonids

Mago II, also known as Magon (Punic: 𐤌𐤂𐤍, mgn, lit. 'shield'), was Shofet of Carthage from 396 to 375 BCE, and was a member of the Magonid dynasty. He became Shofet after the suicide of Himilco II in 396 BCE and was succeeded by Mago III (or Himilco Mago) in 375 BCE.

His reign started during wars with the Greeks of Sicily, who, under the leadership of Dionysius I of Syracuse, had defeated his predecessor. He quelled a rebellion in Libya and made peace with Syracuse at the expense of his Sicilian allies, the Sicels.

War broke out again at the end of his reign, and he died in the Carthaginian defeat of the Battle of Cabala. He was succeeded by his son, also called Mago "Himilco Mago", who led the Carthaginians to a great victory against Dionysius at the battle of Cronium.

== See also ==
- Magonids
