= Battle of the Tigris =

311 BC. military engagement between the Seleucids and Antigonids

- Part of the Babylonian War
| Date | 311 BC |
| Location | south of the river Tigris, close to Babylonia |
| Result | Seleucid victory |

Belligerents
| Seleucids | Antigonids |

Commanders and leaders
| Seleukos | Nikanor †; Eaugoras † |

Strength
| 3,000 infantry; 400 cavalry | 10,000 infantry; 7,000 cavalry |

Casualties and losses
| Light | Entire army killed or captured |

The battle of the river Tigris was an engagement between the Diadochi Seleucus and the Antigonid general Nicanor, on the southern bank of the river Tigris in the year 311 BC. Nicanor was on route to recapture the city of Babylon from Seleucus, but he was defeated when Seleucus surprised him with an assault on his camp during the night, forcing Antigonus to cease hostilities with the other Diadochi, (Ptolemy, Cassander and Lysimachus) in order to concentrate his efforts on recapturing the city of Babylon himself.

== Campaign ==
After Demetrius’ defeat at Gaza in 312 B.C. Seleucus rushed with a few soldiers to his old satrapy of Babylon. On the way he recruited some soldiers, possibly Silver Shields, at Harran, and resumed his advance to retake Babylon. Hearing of this news Nicanor, satrap of the east under Antigonus, quickly assembled an army composed of 10,000 infantry and 7,000 cavalry, with a large contingent under Eaugoras, satrap of Persia, and possibly the remaining Silver Shields who Antigonus had exiled to Arachosia in 316 BC. After assembling his army he marched west, towards Seleucus who could gather no more than 3,400 soldiers. The majority of them were infantry, so Seleucus decided to shadow Nicanor's movements and waited for him to cross the Tigris hiding in the marshy terrain around it.

== Battle ==
Nicanor crossed the river with part of his army and made camp for the night. The camp was lightly guarded because Nicanor thought Seleucus had fled. It was also separated from the main force who had yet to cross the river. Seeing the opportunity, Seleucus attacked Nicanor during the night, and caught Nicanor by surprise. Amidst the fight, Eaugoras was killed and his Persian soldiers fled the battlefield or surrendered to Seleucus. Nicanor's army was overwhelmed, but he was able to escape. The bulk of the remaining soldiers either joined Seleucus or fled.

== Aftermath ==
The news of Seleucus's victory came as a surprise in the west and prompted a shake-up of political alignments, ending the peace. When Antigonus was informed of the battle he ordered his son Demetrius with 19,000 soldiers to recapture Babylonia, but Seleucus was now in a much stronger position as many of Nicanor's soldiers had joined the Seleucid ranks after the battle.
