= Battle of Cabala =

4th-century BC battle in Sicily

- Part of the Sicilian Wars
Date	c. 379 BC
Location	Sicily
Result	Syracusan victory

Belligerents
Syracuse	Carthage

Commanders and leaders
Dionysius I	Mago II †

Casualties and losses
	10,000 killed 5,000 captured

The Battle of Cabala (circa 379 BC) was fought at a place called Cabala (Greek: Κάβαλα, Kábala) on the island of Sicily during the Sicilian Wars between Syracuse, led by Dionysius I, and Carthage, led by Mago II. Syracuse won the battle, and Mago was killed along with 10,000 Carthaginian men; a further 5,000 were taken prisoner. The Carthaginians sued for peace and Mago was replaced by his son, Mago III, who extended the peace a further few days. During that extended period he trained his survivors, and the Battle of Cronium occurred when the peace was over.

== Prelude ==
According to Diodorus Siculus, Dionysius I, tyrant of Syracuse, was looking for an excuse to resume their war with Carthage and decided to use the fact that some of the coastal Sicilian cities under Carthaginian rule were willing to revolt. He decided to make alliances with some of the rebellious cities. The Carthaginians saw this and sent ambassadors to Syracuse to ask for their cities back. They were, however, ignored. Angered by this, Carthage made an alliance with the Italiotes of southern Italy, who were already at war with Syracuse. Mago II, Shofet of Carthage, then recruited a large number of young soldiers from his own populace and raised money to hire a large number of foreign mercenaries. Next the Carthaginians set sail to Sicily and Italy, looking to fight a two-front war. The Syracusians also split their forces, with one portion fighting Mago's forces and the other waging war against the Italiotes. After a few minor battles in Sicily and a march inland, what was described as an "important pitched battle" by Diodorus Siculus was fought on the island between the Carthaginian forces and Syracusians and mercenaries.

== Battle ==
The exact details of the course of the battle are unknown, as is its exact date (placed at 383 BC by Allcroft and Masom, 379 BC by Montagu, 378 BC by Champion, and 377 BC by Ray) and location, although it is assumed to have occurred at an inland position in eastern or central Sicily. However, it is known that Cabala was a decisive victory for Syracuse, with over 10,000 Carthaginians killed and a minimum of 5,000 captured. The Carthaginian survivors were forced to retreat to a fortified hill top that had no access to water. They then fought again and the Carthaginian shofet was killed along with others.

== Aftermath ==
The Carthaginian forces sent a delegation to sue for peace. However, Dionysius decided that the only way he would accept was if their forces retreated from the cities of Sicily and paid reparations for the cost of the war. According to Diodorus Siculus, these terms were considered to be too harsh by the Carthaginians, and they faked satisfaction with the terms, but responded that they were unable to surrender the cities. As that power lay with their government, they requested a truce for a few days for consultation. When Dionysius agreed, the truce took effect. According to Diodorus Siculus, Dionysius hoped that he would then take over all of Sicily. Meanwhile, the Carthaginians held a funeral for their leader, replaced him with his son Mago III, and collected their dead. The new leader made further excuses to extend the peace by a few days. He spent the period of the truce training his troops in preparation for a future battle. When the truce ended, both sides deployed their armies and fought the Battle of Cronium, in which Mago III destroyed the Syracusian army, leaving 14,000 dead.
