= Invasions of Epidamnus =

229 BC military conflict

Two invasions of Epidamnus by Illyrian forces deployed by Queen Teuta attacking the Greek colonies on the Illyrian coast took place as part of the Illyro-Roman Wars in spring 229 BC.

== Prelude ==
In 230 BC, the Illyrians had defeated an Epirote army of Phoenice and prepared to engage a second Greek army, but were called back by Queen Teuta to stop an Illyrian defection to Dardania. Teuta quickly crushed the revolt, and set about taking control of remaining territories in the Adriatic not already under Illyrian control. She began the siege of Issa the same year and sent a large fleet into the Adriatic, which attacked Epidamnus, Corcyra and Apollonia in spring 229 BC.

== Battle ==
Battle of Epidamnus
- Part of the Illyrian Wars
Date	Spring 229 BC
Location	Epidamnus, Illyria (modern day Durrës, Albania)
Result	Greek Victory; Illyrian attack fails;

Belligerents
Epidamnus	Illyrian kingdom

Commanders and leaders
	Queen Teuta

Casualties and losses
Unspecified; City guards killed by Illyrians	

The Illyrians landed at the port of Epidamnus in spring 229 BC, with the pretext of collecting food and water. The Greeks were careless and allowed the Illyrians to enter, with the latter concealing swords to prepare for an assault. They killed the guards of the gate tower and quickly took part of much of the walls of Epidamnus. Eventually, the citizens formed a resistance and pushed the Illyrians outside of the city. The Illyrians then left Epidamnus and joined other Illyrians who were heading southwards towards Corcyra.

== Assistance ==
Following this attack, the cities of Epidamnus, Apollonia and Corcyra requested assistance from the Acheaen and Aetolian leagues to protect them from the Illyrian attacks. The leagues agreed to help, and sent a fleet of ten ships to lift the siege of Corcyra, which the Illyrians had already begun. However, the Greeks were defeated at sea off the coast of Paxus and the Illyrians shortly afterwards captured Corcyra. With this victory, the Illyrians sailed back north towards Epidamnus, and prepared for a second attack.

== Siege ==
Upon arriving from Corcyra, the Illyrians began the siege of Epidamnus in 229 BC. However, following Roman intervention after the breakout of the First Illyrian War, a large Roman army and fleet approached Illyria. After several victories, resulting in the capture of Corcyra and territories of the southern Illyrian tribes, the Romans approached Epidamnus in 229 BC. Upon hearing of this, the Illyrians fled and abandoned the siege.
