= Battle of Suru =

878 BC battle

Date	878 BC
Location	Suru
Result	Assyrian victory

Belligerents
Babylonians	Assyrians

Commanders and leaders
Nabu-apla-iddina	Ashurnasirpal II

The Battle of Suru in 878 BC, was fought in the main fortress of Sukhu (Suhum) between the Assyrians and the Babylonians. The Assyrians noted for their war expertise wrestled away the fortress from the Babylonian state. Although the Assyrians claimed a great victory, this claim is doubted due to subsequent revolts in the middle Euphrates region, and because the Assyrian army under Ashurnasirpal II was never again reported as attacking as far into Sukhu. The Assyrians reportedly captured a contingent of Babylonian cavalry during this battle.

This is one of the few battles reported during this time period concerning Babylonian military affairs. This battle would lead to the rise of the Persians later on.
