= Battle of Myus =

311 BC battle

- Part of the Wars of the Diadochi
| Date | 311 BC |
| Location | Myus (?) / Syria - Levant |
| Result | Antigonid victory Peace of 311 BC |

Belligerents
| Ptolemaics | Antigonids |

Commanders and leaders
| Killes | Demetrios |

The Battle of Myus was a military engagement that took place in 311 BC. The battle occurred in Syria or more generally, the Levant, at an unknown location named Myus, between an Antigonid force led by Demetrius I Poliorcetes and a Ptolemaic force under the command of a close associate of Ptolemy, Cilles. It concluded with an Antigonid victory, permitting to mitigate the defeat of Gaza, and likely led to the Peace of 311 BC among the various Diadochi.

== Background ==
The Third War of the Diadochi saw Ptolemy and Seleucus, who had taken refuge in Egypt, opposing Antigonus I Monophtalmus and his son, Demetrius I. The latter was in charge of the Antigonid armies in Syria. During a decisive confrontation in Palestine, less than a year earlier, Demetrius was defeated by his adversaries and had to flee the battlefield, during the Battle of Gaza. Ptolemy then sent one of his generals, a Macedonian named Cilles, described as one of his close associates by Diodorus Siculus, to take advantage of the victory at Gaza and decisively defeat Demetrius in Syria.

== Battle ==
=== Course ===
The sources are particularly vague and elusive regarding this battle: it took place at an unknown location, likely in Syria or the Levant, named Myus. Demetrius set an ambush for his adversary and managed to destroy a sufficiently significant portion of their forces, although ancient sources varied between the entirety and a small number, to repel the Egyptian incursion.

After receiving news of the battle, while he was in Celaenae, Antigonus responded by moving towards the Levant to assist his son in case of an Egyptian counter-offensive, but it never came. He also emulated publicly his son for the victory. Instead, this victorious ambush seemed to establish a status quo, freezing the Levantine borders; it likely also tilted the balance slightly in favor of the Antigonids, after the defeat at Gaza, in the context of the upcoming peace of 311 BC.

== Legacy ==
Besides Diodorus Siculus, Plutarch, and Pausanias who mention the event, Plautus referenced it in one of his works, Curculio (The Weevil).
