= First siege of Babylon =

4th Century BC siege

Siege of Babylon
- Part of the Babylonian War
Date	May–August 311 BC
Location	Babylon
Result	Seleucid victory, beginning of the Babylonian War
Territorial changes	Establishment of Seleucus' rule over Babylon

Belligerents
Seleucids	Antigonids

Commanders and leaders
Seleukos	Unknown

Strength
2,000	Unknown but smaller

Casualties and losses
Few	All killed or captured

The first siege of Babylon was a successful siege of one of its citadels, loyal to Antigonus, by forces under Seleucus in 311 BC.

== Context ==
After the partition of Babylon Seleucus was appointed as the satrap of Babylon. In 315 BC he was forced to leave and, fearing Antigonus increasing power, took refuge at Ptolemy's court, where he remained until he and Ptolemy defeated Antigonus's son Demetrius at Gaza in 312 BC. Subsequently, Ptolemy gave him 200 cavalry and 800 foot soldiers, and he began his advance towards his old satrapy of Babylon.

== Campaign ==
Seleucus marched towards Harran (also known as Carrhae) where he was joined by around 1000 veteran troops, probably a portion of the Silver Shields captured at Gabiene. He then proceeded towards Babylon, which he reach in May. The populace welcomed him, as he was well regarded by them, but a small force loyal to Antigonus entrenched themselves in the citadel of the palace.

== Siege ==
Seleucus laid siege on the citadel, but eager to avoid casualties, he decided to cut the water supply to the city and began to build a dam on the river Euphrates, which passed between the citadel walls, until it created an artificial lake on the hill, but as the citadel continued to resist him, he ordered the dam to be suddenly broken. In the ensuing downstream flood the walls of the citadel were destroyed and the garrison surrendered after token resistance.

== Aftermath ==
Seleucus became ruler of Babylon again, however, Antigonus had enough power to recapture the city at any moment, and one of his generals, Nicanor was already on the way. This episode marks the start of the Babylonian War.

== Sources ==
- https://www.livius.org/sources/content/diodorus/the-beginning-of-the-babylonian-war/
- Chronicle of the Diadochi, rev., iv.7'.
- https://www.livius.org/sources/content/mesopotamian-chronicles-content/bchp-3-diadochi-chronicle/
- Diodorus Siculus, World History, 19.90-93
