= Cilles =

Macedonian general, 4th century BC

- Native name: Ancient Greek: Κίλλης, romanized: Killēs
- Allegiance: Ptolemy I
- Rank: general
- Conflicts: Battle of Myus

Cilles (Ancient Greek: Κίλλης, romanized: Killēs) was a Macedonian Greek general of the 4th century BC. He served Ptolemy I and was defeated by Demetrius I Poliorcetes at the Battle of Myus in 311 BC.

== Biography ==
Cilles is a little-known historical figure, apart from his confrontation with Demetrius at the Battle of Myus, where, sent by Ptolemy to decisively crush the Antigonid, he was defeated by his adversary. He was described by Plutarch as being a friend of Ptolemy. His defeat led to the end of the Third War of the Diadochi.
