= Siege of Dong'ou =

- Part of Southward expansion of the Han dynasty
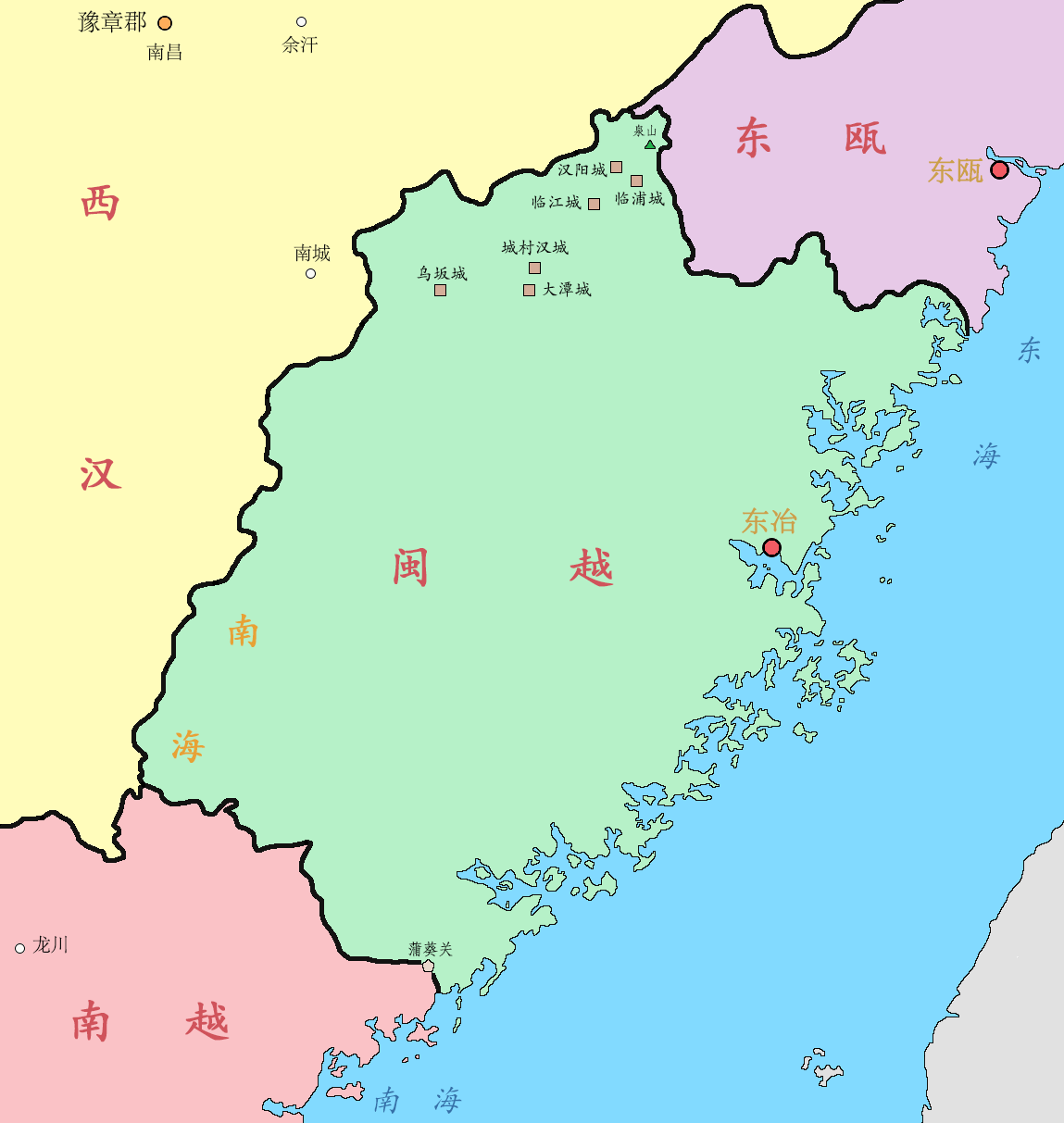
- Map of Minyue and Dong'ou
| Date | 138 BC |
| Location | Kingdom of Dong'ou |
| Result | Minyue withdrew as Han intervened; Dong’ou submitted to the Han and migrated its entire state to Jianghuai |

Belligerents
| The Kingdom of Dong'ou; The Han Empire | The Kingdom of Minyue |

The siege of Dong’ou (Chinese: 浮海救东瓯; lit. 'Floating by sea to rescue Dong’ou') was a military campaign in 138 BC, in which Dong’ou, after being invaded by Minyue, appealed to the Han dynasty of China for assistance, and the Han dispatched troops by sea to relieve it.

After the Rebellion of the Seven States in 154 BC, Liu Ju, who had fled to Minyue and harboured resentment over his father’s death, repeatedly urged Minyue to attack Dong’ou. In 138 BC, King Ying of Minyue sent forces to besiege the capital of Dong’ou. With its provisions exhausted, Dong’ou sought help from the Han dynasty. At the Han court, a debate arose over whether troops should be dispatched.

Emperor Wu of Han ultimately adopted the advice of Zhuang Zhu, mobilising forces from Kuaiji Commandery and placing them under Zhuang Zhu’s command to sail by sea. Upon hearing of the approaching Han forces, Minyue withdrew. Shortly thereafter, the entire population of Dong’ou was relocated inland to the Jianghuai region. The King of Dong’ou surrendered and was enfeoffed as the Marquis of Guangwu. The state of Dong’ou thus came to an end, and its former territory was gradually occupied by Minyue.

== Background ==
In 192 BC, to contain the kingdom of Minyue, Emperor Hui of Han posthumously enfeoffed Yao as King of Donghai, establishing Dong’ou as his capital. Yao’s son, Zhaoxiang, succeeded to the throne.

Dong’ou, like Minyue and Nanyue, was treated as an external vassal state rather than being directly administered by the Han dynasty. It remained independent in military affairs, household registration, language, and culture. In 152 BC, Dong’ou accepted a title conferred by the Han court and became a subordinate state of the Han dynasty. However, before the Rebellion of the Seven States, it was in practice under the control of Liu Pi, the Prince of Wu.

In 154 BC, Liu Pi launched the Rebellion of the Seven States. Minyue refused to join his anti-Han campaign, whereas Dong’ou took part. After Liu Pi was defeated, he fled to Dong’ou, prompting the Han court to dispatch a secret envoy to seek Dong’ou’s surrender. Dong’ou’s forces then lured Liu Pi into a trap, and during his inspection of the troops, Yiwū, the king’s younger brother and a general, killed him and presented his head to Emperor Jing. In return, Dong’ou was granted imperial clemency.

== Siege ==
After Liu Pi’s death, his son Liu Ziju fled to Minyue, sought refuge with King Ying of Minyue, and looked for an opportunity to borrow troops to avenge his father. The Han court dispatched Feng Zhonglang to pursue him, but Feng travelled through Dong’ou into Minyue and died of illness after reaching Pucheng, and the pursuit came to nothing. Liu Ziju then exploited King Ying’s ambition to annex Dongyue, using the prospect of seizing Dong’ou territory as an inducement and urging Minyue to send troops.

In 138 BC, King Ying of Minyue attacked Dong’ou and besieged its capital. Supplies inside the city were cut off. The King of Dong’ou sent envoys who broke through the encirclement to seek aid from the Han court. Emperor Wu had only recently ascended the throne and attached great importance to the crisis, canvassing his ministers for their views.

Grand Commandant Tian Fen argued that warfare among the Yue peoples was routine, and that Minyue and Dong’ou had repeatedly rebelled against Han authority, so it was not worth mobilising forces from China for a remote frontier dispute. Moreover, he maintained that since the Qin dynasty, the region had been regarded as expendable and not necessary to bring under direct control, and therefore the Han dynasty should not intervene simply because Dong’ou was in distress. Court Gentleman Zhuang Zhu countered that abandonment of territory was not unique to the Yue region, noting that the Qin dynasty had even fled and relinquished their capital, Xianyang. Zhuang stressed that if the Han had the capacity to rescue a small state but chose not to, other states would cease to seek Han protection, and the emperor would lose the ability to command and integrate the realm. He therefore advocated sending troops to demonstrate Han authority and suzerainty.

Emperor Wu accepted Zhuang Zhu’s argument and decided to relieve Dong’ou. However, he also insisted that, as a newly enthroned ruler, he did not wish to issue tiger tallies in the name of the central government to requisition troops from the commanderies and princedoms, and instead required Zhuang to raise forces in his personal capacity. Ordered to supervise the expedition by sea, Zhuang met resistance from the administrator of Kuaiji Commandery, who feared a protracted mobilisation and refused to provide troops. Zhuang executed him and compelled the mobilisation to proceed. When the Han forces set sail, King Ying of Minyue withdrew upon hearing the news, and Dong’ou was thus relieved.

== Aftermath ==
Soon after Minyue withdrew, the King of Dong’ou asked Emperor Wu of Han for permission to lead his people to migrate to Jianghuai. More than forty thousand people were resettled in Lujiang Commandery, and the King of Dong’ou surrendered his royal title and was reduced to the rank of Marquis of Guangwu. From this point, the state of Dong’ou ceased to exist. The migration left Dong’ou largely depopulated, and Minyue people moved in and effectively absorbed the territory. To deter further Minyue expansion, Emperor Wu appointed Yan Zhu as Administrator of Kuaiji Commandery as a warning. The Han government then used Kuaiji as a foothold to extend control gradually from Kuaiji towards the Ling river basin across the former lands of Dong’ou, possibly resulting in a north south division with Minyue along the Ou River.

In 135 BC, King Ying of Minyue attacked Nanyue, and Zhao Hu, King of Nanyue, submitted a memorial to the Han court requesting reinforcements. Emperor Wu sent troops against Minyue. Ying immediately prepared to resist at strategic passes, but his younger brother Yushan judged the Han forces too powerful to oppose. Together with senior ministers, Yushan killed Ying and surrendered to the Han. The Han then enfeoffed Yushan as King of Dongyue, effectively recognising Minyue’s absorption of Dong’ou. In autumn 111 BC, Yushan proclaimed himself emperor and launched a rebellion against the Han. Emperor Wu subsequently subdued Minyue, and because Minyue had rebelled repeatedly, the local population was relocated en masse to China proper.
