= Battle of Cronium =

Part of the 4th-century BC Sicilian Wars

- Part of the Sicilian Wars
Date	c. 376 BC
Location	near Palermo, Sicily
Result	Carthaginian victory

Belligerents
Syracuse	Carthage

Commanders and leaders
Dionysius I	Himilco Margo

Casualties and losses
14,000	

The Battle of Cronium (c. 376 BC) was part of the Sicilian Wars and took place in Sicily. A Syracusan army, led by Dionysius I, was defeated by a Carthaginian army, led by Himilco Mago, Mago II's son. The Carthaginians won the day having routed the enemy army. Leptines, Dionysius' brother, was killed during the battle. The location of Cronium (Greek: Κρόνιον, Krónion) is considered to be close to modern Palermo.

== Background ==
Dionysius, the tyrant of Syracuse, having concluded a peace treaty with the Carthaginians after the Battle of Chrysas, was looking for a reason to renew the war. He found one when the subjugated cities of the Carthaginians started a revolt. Dionysius allied himself with the cities. The Carthaginians sent envoys to Dionysius to ask for the return of their subject cities, but they were ignored, so the war was renewed. The Carthaginians sent an army to Sicily to confront Dionysius. Their army, however, was defeated at Cabala. The Carthaginian shofet, Mago II, died in battle and his son Mago III became the new general. The Carthaginians had concluded a truce for a few days but, at its expiration, the two armies confronted each other again, this time at Cronium.

== Battle ==
The battle started with a tough fight on one of the Syracusan wings, where Leptines was stationed. Leptines was said to have died a glorious death, having killed many enemies. At his fall the Carthaginians were emboldened; they began pushing and were able to rout their enemies. Dionysius, whose troops were a select band, were winning the fight, but after having received the news of the fall of Leptines and the defeat of the other wing, they were dismayed and took flight. When the rout became general, the Carthaginians pursued the more eagerly and called out to one another to take no captives; and so all those who were caught were put to death. The Syracusan casualties were found to number more than fourteen thousand.

== Aftermath ==
After this great victory, the Carthaginians returned to Panormus. They sent envoys to Dionysius and gave him the chance to end the war. The tyrant accepted the envoys' offer, and a truce was concluded. This included that both sides kept their territory, but with only one exception, the Carthaginians receiving Selinous and Acragas. Dionysius had to pay the Carthaginians 1,000 talents.
