= Battle of Lize =

Battle

Coordinates: 30.8997°N 120.953°E

- Part of Spring and Autumn period
Date	478 BC
Location	Lize (笠泽)
Result	Yue victory

Belligerents
Wu	Yue

Commanders and leaders
Fu Chai	Gou Jian

Strength
50,000	50,000

Casualties and losses
30,000–45,000	1,000–10,000

The Battle of Lize (笠泽之战) was fought between the states of Wu and Yue in the Spring and Autumn period of Chinese history. In 478 BC, Yue attacked Wu and defeated Wu's army.
