= Battle of Ctesiphon (165) =

165 battle in Roman-Parthian Wars

Coordinates: 33.104°N 44.592°E

- Part of the Parthian war of Lucius Verus
| Date | 165 |
| Location | Ctesiphon, Mesopotamia |
| Result | Roman victory |

Belligerents
| Roman Empire | Parthian Empire |

Commanders and leaders
| Avidius Cassius | Vologases IV |

Strength
| Capable of raising many soldiers | Capable of raising many soldiers |

Casualties and losses
| Heavy | Heavy |

The Battle of Ctesiphon in 165 AD was part of the wider Roman-Parthian War. The Parthians had tried but failed to take Armenia in the previous years, but a Roman counter-attack saw them lay a successful siege and capture of Ctesiphon.

== Aftermath ==
Like the previous invasion attempts, the Romans made no attempt at permanently occupying Ctesiphon. In the end, the Parthians managed to re-group. However, the Parthians were becoming steadily weaker, with more concessions given to the Roman Empire and the Parthian nobles and vassal kingdoms.
