= Siege of Eucratideia =

168 BCE siege

Date	c. 169 BC
Location	Eucratideia
Result	Indecisive: Presumed destruction of Eucratideia; Eucratides flees into India.

Belligerents
Indo-Greek Kingdom	Greco-Bactrian Kingdom

Commanders and leaders
Demetrius II	Eucratides I

Strength
60,000	300

The siege of Eucratideia was a five-month-long siege of the city that occurred in around 169 BC. Demetrius II, a descendant of Euthydemus, besieged the usurper Eucratides although being repelled various times.

== Siege and aftermath ==
The year before, Eucratides had usurped the power in Greco-Bactria while one of its rulers, Demetrius II, was conquering parts of northern India. Demetrius then made his way back into Bactria and besieged Eucratides at the site of Eucratideia. Demetrius had an army supposedly numbering 60,000 troops, although this is unlikely. Eucratides however, against overwhelming odds, managed to repel various times the Indo-Greek forces with a small garrison of 300 men. After the siege had endured five months, he managed to escape into India and subjugated most of the northwestern parts.
