= Battle of Plataea (323 BC) =

Battle between Athens and Boeotia

- Part of Lamian War
Date	323 BC
Location	Plataea, Boeotia
Result	Athenian victory

Belligerents
Athens	Boeotia

Commanders and leaders
Leosthenes	Unknown

Strength
5,000 soldiers 500 cavalry 2,000 mercenaries	Unknown

The Battle of Plataea was fought during 323 BC between the Athenian and Boeotian armies during the Lamian War.

When a coalition of cities including Athens and the Aetolian League decided to wage war against the Macedonian empire in 323 BC, the Boeotians opposed the decision. After Alexander the Great had destroyed Thebes in 335 BC he had given the Theban lands to the Boeotians, but without Macedon as hegemon in central Greece the Boeotians feared the Athenians would revive Theban power as a counterweight to the Macedonians and so the Boeotians would lose the lands they gained.

When Athens sent reinforcements to the army led by Athenian general, Leosthenes, the Boeotians mobilized to resist the Athenians. The Athenians' reinforcements consisted of five thousand men and five hundred horses, as well as two thousand mercenaries, while Leosthenes moved with part of his forces to meet with them. After joining with the Athenian reinforcements, Leosthenes formed his men in line and attacked the Boeotian camp, defeating the enemy. After the victory he hurried back to Thermopylae where he would meet Antipater's army.
