= Median invasion of Urartu =

Median Invasion/campaign conducted by King Cyaxares against the Kingdom of Urartu

Date	between 609–590 BC
Location	Armenian Highlands
Result	Median-Scythian victory: Fall of Urartu
Territorial changes	Medes conquer the Armenian highlands, and later conquer western Anatolia in the aftermath

Belligerents
Median kingdom Scythians	Kingdom of Urartu; Kingdom of Manna

Commanders and leaders
Cyaxares	Rusa IV

The Median Invasion of Urartu refers to the military campaigns conducted by the Median Empire and King Cyaxares against the Kingdom of Urartu in the late 7th century BC to the early 6th century BC. These invasions were part of a broader series of conflicts involving the Medes, Scythians, and other groups that contributed to the downfall of Urartu and the eventual rise of the Median Empire as a dominant power in the region.

== Background ==
Urartu was a powerful Iron Age kingdom centered around the Armenian highlands between Lake Van, Lake Urmia, and Lake Sevan. The territory of the ancient kingdom of Urartu extended over the modern frontiers of Turkey, Iran, Iraq, and Armenia. Its kings left behind cuneiform inscriptions in the Urartian language, a member of the Hurro-Urartian language family. However it was almost constantly at war with the Assyrians to their south. This weakened Urartu. Meanwhile Cyaxares had just conquered the Assyrian Empire with allied Nabopolassar of Babylon. The confidence and noticing that Urartu was weakened probably laid the steps for Cyaxares to invade.

== Invasion ==
When the invasion actually happened is debated between historians, sources vary all the way from 609 BC to 590 BC. Either way, Cyaxares pitted his forces against the kingdoms of Urartu and Manna. This assault resulted in both kingdoms exiting the historical record around 590 BCE , when the Hebrew prophet Jeremiah mentions them as subjects of the Medes. Sources state that Cyaxares "overran" Urartu. probably meaning the invasion happened fast and swiftly, with little resistance, considering Urartu was weakened.

== Aftermath ==
The fall of Urartu led to the emergence of a new Armenian kingdom in the mountains of eastern Anatolia that recognized Median Suzerainty. From Armenia, the conquering Medes pushed westward toward the Black sea. They were welcomed there by wandering bands of Cimmerians and Scythians that still roamed the inland region of Asia Minor, which had come to be known as Cappadocia. The occupation of this region precipitated a six-year-long war with the western Anatolian kingdom of Lydia (590-585 BC). This resulted the Medes to rule all of Asia Minor across the river Halys. Which ended up becoming the common border between the Medes and the Lydians after the war ended in a stalemate.

== See also ==
- Medo-Babylonian conquest of the Assyrian Empire
- Urartu-Assyria war
