= Battle of the Aufidus =

Battle in the Social War

The Battle of the Aufidus was a battle during the Social War. Shortly after taking Cannae but losing a subsequent hard-fought battle to the rebels, the Roman commander, Gaius Cosconius, decided to make a stand at the Aufidus near Cannae. The rebel commander, Trebatius, sent word to Cosconius to either cross the river and fight, or withdraw and allow the Samnite army to cross. Cosconius retreated, letting the rebels cross, but when they were in the process of crossing he attacked them, killing 15,000. Samnite commander Marius Egnatius was slain, and Trebatius was forced to withdraw inside the walls of Canusium. This victory brought the Romans control of the whole of Apulia and the Iapygian Peninsula which they plundered and burned. At the same time Sulla was campaigning equally successful in the south-west, contrasting the many early defeats of the Roman army during the Social War.
