= Battle of Asophon =

104 BC battle by the Jordan River

- Part of Ptolemy IX's invasion of Judea
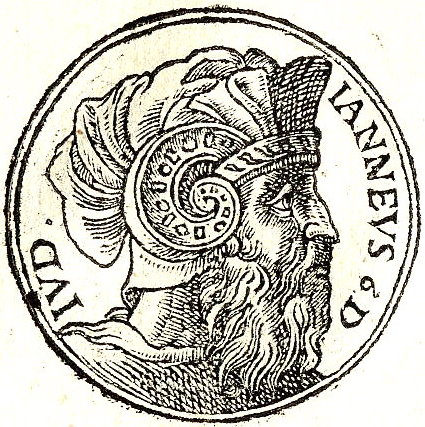
- Alexander Jannaeus minted on a coin.
Date	104 BC
Location	Near Saphoth (Asophon), Jordan River
Result	Ptolemaic victory
Territorial changes	Ptolemaic capture of Ptolemais.

Belligerents
Hasmonean Kingdom	Ptolemaic Kingdom

Commanders and leaders
Alexander Jannaeus	Ptolemy IX Lathyros

Strength
50,000 (Josephus); 80,000 (Timagenes)	30,000

Casualties and losses
30,000 killed (Josephus); 50,000 killed (Timagenes); Unknown number captured	Heavy casualties (exact number unknown)

The Battle of Asophon took place in 104 BCE when the forces of the Hasmonean Kingdom of Judea, under Alexander Jannaeus, confronted the Ptolemaic forces of Ptolemy IX Lathyros in the area near the Jordan River, not far from the place called Saphoth (Asophon). This was one of the major battles during the invasion of Ptolemy into Judea and resulted in a clear victory for the Ptolemies as Alexander's army broke up late in the battle.

Having come to power upon the death of his brother Aristobulus I, Alexander decided to conquer all independent cities located along the Mediterranean coast. As a result of this decision, Ptolemais was selected as a prime target. This coastal city was surrounded after Alexander's defeat of the defending force, but since he was unable to conquer it, he decided to lay siege to the city.

This happened amid the continuous civil war of Seleucid kings Antiochus Philometor and Antiochus Cyzicenus, which prevented any assistance to the city. Only some help was provided by the tyrant Zoilus who ruled Strato's Tower and Dora. Nevertheless, the inhabitants of Ptolemais sought a stronger ally and managed to reach out to Ptolemy IX Lathyros, the former king of Cyprus, promising him support from Gaza, the Sidonians, Zoilus and others in case he decided to attack Alexander.

In spite of the arguments raised by the influential citizens of Ptolemais that the help of Ptolemy would change one enemy for another and bring an invasion of Cleopatra III to Judea, the preparations for the expedition were already undertaken by the latter. Thus, Ptolemy arrived to Syria with an army of approximately 30,000 infantry and cavalry and approached Ptolemais, but was not admitted to the city because of its changed mind-set. At the same time, Zoilus and the people of Gaza asked him to protect them from approaching Alexander.

Confronted with this situation, Alexander lifted the siege of Ptolemais and went back to Judea. On the surface, he made an alliance and even promised Ptolemy 400 talents of silver as a compensation for his conquest of Zoilus and the annexation of his territories to Judea, but in secret, Alexander sent his ambassadors to Cleopatra and called upon her to make war with her son. Upon the revelation of this plot by Ptolemy, he immediately dissolved his alliance, continued fighting and invaded Judea. In order to prepare for the coming battle, Ptolemy attacked Galilean city of Asochis on the Sabbath day and took away 10,000 inhabitants as slaves with considerable plunder.

As a result, Alexander gathered a big field army from all parts of Judea, which Josephus estimated to be 50,000 strong, though other ancient sources suggested the size of the army was 80,000. The two armies met near the Jordan River beside the settlement of Saphoth, where the river separated the two camps of the opposing forces. Alexander placed 8,000 of his best infantrymen, called Hecatontomachi, in the first row and distinguished them by their heavy armor and bronze shields. In response, Ptolemy arranged his strongest bronze-shielded infantry at the head of his army, though Josephus noted that the rest of his army was not so confident as the army of Alexander.

The battle started with the order of the camp-master of Ptolemy, Philostephanus, to cross the river, which separated the two armies. Alexander willingly let the army of his opponent to cross the river and thought that after doing so, the enemy will find itself in a difficult position since it will have no chances to retreat if it will be defeated. During the initial stage of the fighting, both armies showed equal strength and courage and losses among the two sides were quite significant. Slowly, the Hasmoneans gained the upper hand and managed to push parts of the Ptolemaic army back.

Then, Philostephanus decided to throw in the auxiliary force in order to reinforce the army of Ptolemy, which was slowly giving way to Hasmoneans. But Alexander did not have any reserve force to help his exhausted front-line fighters and they started to break down. When the first part of the Jewish army retreated, then the neighboring units followed them and a full retreat of the army started. Ptolemy's soldiers relentlessly pursued the army and killed the retreating Hasmoneans, as Josephus reports, until their iron weapons became blunted and their hands were tired from slaughter. Josephus tells that 30,000 soldiers were killed and historian Timagenes reports the number to be 50,000; the rest were either taken prisoners or retreated back into Judea.

After winning the battle, Ptolemy was able to gain control over many parts of Judean country and to ravage many villages there without any organized resistance. As the night fell, the forces of Ptolemy settled in those villages, which consisted mainly of women and children, and as Josephus claims, Ptolemy ordered to massacre them and commit many acts of brutalities to create terror among the local population. In this way, he wanted to create a fear of cannibalism among the fleeing Judeans and spread the panic among the remaining forces; Josephus also states that Strabo and Nicolaus of Damascus repeated this story.

As the result of this battle, Ptolemy managed to take Ptolemais, which initially called him for help. Thus, this victory represented the top of the campaign of Ptolemy.
