= Bassania =

Illyrian city

Bassania was an Illyrian city that came under Roman control during the Illyrian Wars. It was located close to the ancient city of Lissus in southern Illyria, modern Albania. The inhabitants of the city were called Bassanitae. The time when the Bassanitae became socii of the Romans is still unknown. Bassania is believed to be located near the village of Bushat, in Shkodër, Albania.

== Location ==
Carl Patsch identified Bassania with the village of Pedhanë or Pllanë on the river Mat entering the plain. A recent discovery in modern Bushat village within the Shkodër County suggests an alternative possible location of Bassania in this site. The ruins of the ancient city in Bushat extended in a surface three times of the ancient ruins of Shkodër (nearest city), massive stone walls surrounded an area of about 20 hectares, were discovered by a team of Polish-Albanian Archaeologists in 2018. The city wall is massive. Measuring 3 meters thick, the wall is made from huge stone blocks packed tightly against each other. In between the stone blocks are earth and small stones filled in to close off any gaps. Ancient coins and portions of ceramic artifacts recovered near the walls date back to the 4th to 1st century BC, providing further confirmation of the age of the city ruin. The city seems to have existed until the beginning of the 1st century AD, which coincided with the end of the reign of Roman emperor Octavian Augustus. It was destroyed or abandoned during the Roman invasion.

== See also ==
- List of settlements in Illyria

== Bibliography ==
- Demiraj, Bardhyl (2016). "Ilir. Bassania". Konferencë shkencore: Ndre Mjeda – 150 vjetori i lindjes. Prishtinë: Akademia e Shkencave dhe e Arteve e Kosovës, Seksioni i Gjuhësisë dhe i Letërsisë; Akademia e Shkencave e Shqipërisë.
- Derow, Peter (2015). A. Erskine; J. Crawley Quinn (eds.). Rome, Polybius and the East. Oxford: OUP. ISBN 978-0199640904.
- Šašel Kos, Marjeta (2005). Appian and Illyricum. Narodni Muzej Slovenije. ISBN 978-961-6169-36-3.
- Wilkes, John J. (1992). The Illyrians. Oxford, United Kingdom: Blackwell Publishing. ISBN 0-631-19807-5.
