= Antigonid dynasty =

Dynasty of Hellenistic kings

Antigonids Antigonid dynasty Ἀντιγονίδαι Antigonidai
- 306 BC–168 BC
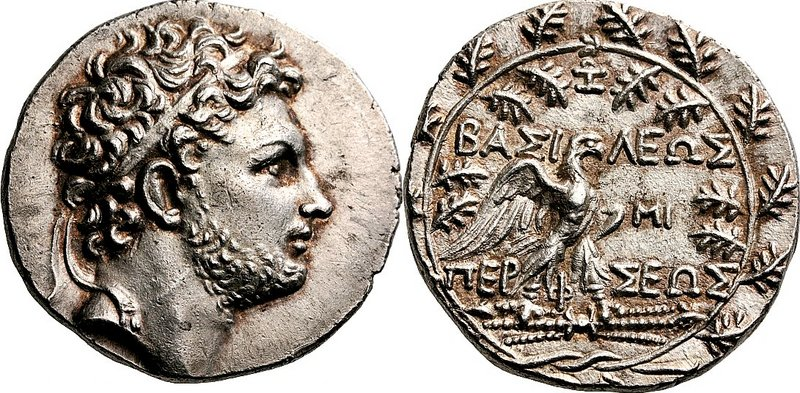
- Tetradrachm with the Eagle of Zeus and the inscription ΒΑΣΙΛΕΩΣ ΠΕΡΣΕΩΣ, "[coin] of King Perseus"

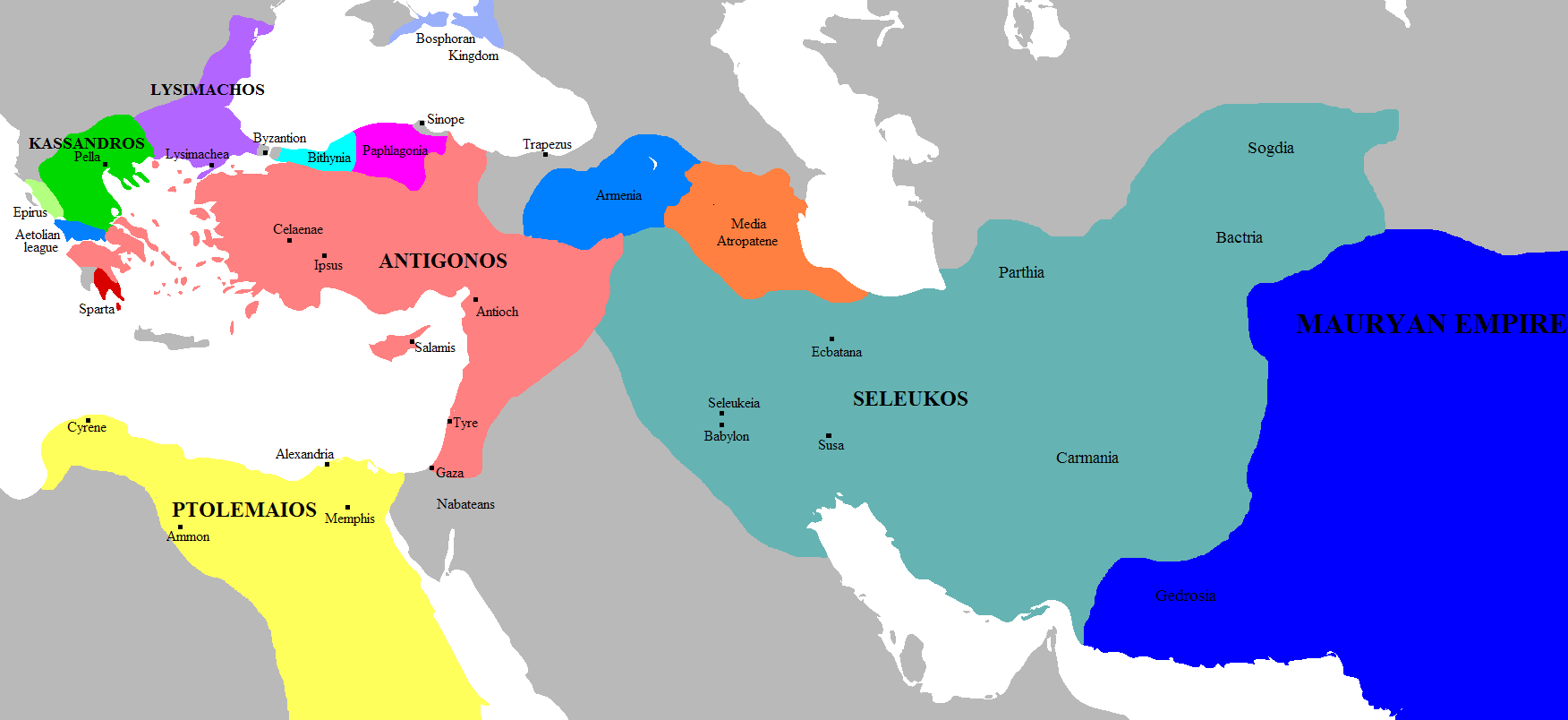
- The Antigonid Empire and the rival Diadochi states circa 303 BC
- Capital: Antigoneia (Syria) (Antigonus I); Demetrias, Thessaly (Demetrius I); Pella, Macedon (since Antigonus II)
- Common languages: Greek
- Religion: Ancient Greek / Hellenistic
- Government: Monarchy
- Basileus
  - 306 BC – 301 BC: Antigonus I Monophthalmus
  - 179 BC – 168 BC: Perseus of Macedon
- Historical era: Hellenistic
  - Established: 306 BC
  - Defeat by Rome: 168 BC
Preceded by
Macedonian Empire
Succeeded by
Seleucid Empire
Ptolemaic Empire
Roman province of Macedonia

The Antigonid dynasty (/ænˈtɪɡoʊnɪd/; Ancient Greek: Ἀντιγονίδαι) was a Macedonian Greek royal house which ruled the kingdom of Macedon during the Hellenistic period. It was founded by Antigonus I Monophthalmus, a general and successor of Alexander the Great who first came to power during the Diadochi Wars. He took the title of basileus after the victory of his son Demetrius Poliorcetes at the Battle of Salamis in 306 BC. Antigonids ruled much of Hellenistic Greece from 294 until their defeat at the Battle of Pydna in 168 BC during the Third Macedonian War, after which Macedon came under the control of the Roman Republic.

The wars of the Diadochi witnessed the fall of the Argead dynasty in Macedon resulting in a power vacuum, which the Antigonid and Antipatrid dynasties sought to occupy. Demetrius ousted Cassander's governor of Athens in 306 BC giving his father control over a land spanning from the Aegean Sea to the Middle East, a territory also known as the Antigonid Empire.

Despite the subsequent instability and loss of the Asian territory, the family managed to maintain its power in mainland Greece and the islands, with Antigonus II Gonatas ultimately solidifying Antigonid rule over Macedon. Antigonus III Doson further expanded Macedonian influence in southern Greece reestablishing the Hellenic Alliance with himself as leader. Under Philip V, Antigonid Macedon first came into conflict with Rome, which had already become a decisive power in the Mediterranean. In the second century BC, the last Antigonid king, Perseus, became known as the champion of Greek resistance against Rome, albeit Rome's control over Greece began to steadily expand, culminating in the fall of the dynasty in 168.

== History ==
The beginning of Hellenistic Greece was defined by the struggle between the Antipatrid dynasty, led first by Cassander (r. 305 – 297 BC), son of Antipater, and the Antigonid dynasty, led by Antigonus I Monophthalmus (r. 306 – 301 BC) and his son, the future king Demetrius I Poliorcetes (r. 294 – 288 BC). After the power crisis in Macedon, which culminated in Philip III's and Euridice's death, Cassander managed to seize control from Olympias and began to establish his authority in the kingdom; in 316 BC he buried Philip III and Euridice at Aegae and married Philip II's daughter, Thessalonica, thus becoming a member of the Argead dynasty. In 310/309 BC, Cassander commanded Glaucias to secretly assassinate the 14-year-old Alexander IV, son of Alexander the Great, and his mother Roxane and the Macedonian Argead dynasty became extinct.

In 307 BC, Demetrius I successfully ousted Cassander's governor of Athens, Demetrius of Phalerum, and after defeating Ptolemy I at the Battle of Salamis in 306 BC he conquered the island Cyprus. Following that victory, Demetrius' father, Antigonus I, assumed the title of Basileus ("King" of Alexander's Empire) by the assembled armies and gained control over the Aegean, the eastern Mediterranean, and most of the Middle East. While Antigonus and Demetrius attempted to recreate Philip II's Hellenic league with themselves as dual hegemons, a revived coalition of Cassander, Ptolemy I Soter, Seleucus I Nicator, and Lysimachus decisively defeated the Antigonids at the Battle of Ipsus in 301 BC, during which Antigonus I was killed. Demetrius I survived the battle and in 294 BC –during the struggles between Casander's sons Alexander V and Antipater I– he managed to seize control of Athens and establish himself as king of Macedon. In 288 BC, he was driven out by Pyrrhus and Lysimachus and eventually died as a prisoner of Seleucus I Nicator. After a long period of instability, Demetrius' son Antigonus II Gonatas was able to establish the family's control over the old Kingdom of Macedon, as well as over most of the Greek city-states by 276 BC.

Map of the 2nd Macedonian War

== Legacy ==
The Antigonid was one of four dynasties established by Alexander's successors, the others being the Seleucid dynasty, Ptolemaic dynasty and Antipatrid dynasty. The last scion of the dynasty, Perseus of Macedon, who reigned between 179 and 168 BC, proved unable to stop the advancing Roman legions and Macedon's defeat at the Battle of Pydna signaled the end of the dynasty.

== Dynasty ==
The ruling members of the Antigonid dynasty were:

Antigonid rulers
King	Reign (BC)	Consort(s)	Comments
Antigonus I Monophthalmus (Western Asian Antigonid kingdom)	306–301 BC	Stratonice	One of Alexander the Great's top generals; a major participant in the so-called "funeral games" following that king's death. "Monophthalmus" is Greek for "One-eyed," a reference to a disfiguring battle scar.
Demetrius I Poliorcetes (Macedon, Cicilia)	294–287 BC	Phila; Ptolemais; Deïdameia; Lanassa ?Eurydice ?Unnamed Illyrian woman	Son of Antigonus I Monophthalmus. Demetrius' wife Phila was a daughter of Antipater, and ancestor of all subsequent Antigonid kings of Macedon, except Antigonus III Doson, through her son Antigonus II Gonatas. Antigonus III Doson was descended from the marriage of Demetrius and Ptolemais, who was a daughter of Ptolemy I Soter and mother of Doson's father, Demetrius the Fair, the ephemeral King of Cyrene. Deïdameia was a daughter of Aeacides of Epirus and sister of Pyrrhus, she had one son, Alexander, by Demetrius. Demetrius had a further two sons, Demetrius the Thin and Corrhagus, the former by an unnamed Illyrian woman, the latter by a woman named Eurydice. Demetrius I Poliorcetes was the first Antigonid king of Macedon.
Antigonus II Gonatas (Macedon)	276–239 BC	Phila	Son of Demetrius Poliorcetes and Phila, grandson of Antigonus I Monophthalmus. His wife, Phila, was the daughter of his sister, Stratonice. Only one known legitimate child, Demetrius II Aetolicus.
Demetrius the Fair (Cyrene)	c. 250 BC	Olympias of Larissa; Berenice II	Son of Demetrius I Poliorcetes and Ptolemaïs. Father of Antigonus III Doson and, apparently, Echecrates by Olympias.
Demetrius II Aetolicus (Macedon)	239–229 BC	Stratonice of Macedon; Phthia of Epirus; Nicaea of Corinth; Chryseis	Son of Antigonus II and Phila. Stratonice of Macedon was a daughter of Antiochus I Soter and Stratonice. Phthia of Epirus was a daughter of Alexander II of Epirus and Olympias II of Epirus. Nicaea of Corinth was the widow of Demetrius' cousin, Alexander of Corinth. Chryseis was a former captive of Demetrius. Only known son, Philip by Chryseis, also had a daughter by Stratonice of Macedon, Apama III.
Antigonus III Doson (Macedon)	229–221 BC	Chryseis	Son of Demetrius the Fair and Olympias of Larissa. Children unknown.
Philip V (Macedon)	221–179 BC	Polycratia of Argos	Son of Demetrius II and Chryseis. At least four children: Perseus of Macedon, Apame, Demetrius and Philippus.
Perseus (Macedon)	179–168 BC (died 166 BC)	Laodice V	The last ruler of Macedon. Laodice V was a daughter of the Seleucid king, Seleucus IV Philopator. At least two sons, Philip and Alexander.

The Greek rebel against Rome and last King of Macedonia, Andriscus, claimed to be the son of Perseus.

== Family tree of Antigonids ==
Derdas II
Derdas III archon of Elimiotis	Machatas of Elimeia	Phila of Elimeia	Philip II king of Macedonia; 359-336 BC
Philip satrap of India	wife	Periandros of Pella
Demetrius	Stratonice daughter of Corrhaeus	Antigonus I Monophthalmus king of Macedonia; 306-301 BC	Ptolemy	Marsyas
1.Phila daughter of Antipater; 2.Eurydice of Athens; 3.Deidamia I of Epirus daughter of Aeacides of Epirus	Demetrius I Poliorketes king of Macedon; 294-288 BC	4.Lanassa daughter of Agathocles of Syracuse; 5.Ptolemais daughter of Ptolemy I of Egypt	Philip prince
(1) Stratonice of Syria ∞ 1.Seleucus I Nicator; 2.Antiochus I Soter	(1) Antigonus II Gonatas king of Macedon; 277-274, 272-239 BC	Phila daughter of Seleucus I Nicator	(5) Demetrius the Fair king of Cyrene; 250-249 BC	1.Olympias of Larissa; 2.Berenice II daughter of Magas king of Cyrene
(2) 1.Stratonice of Macedon	Demetrius II Aetolicus king of Macedonia; 239-229 BC	2.Nicaea of Corinth; 3.Phthia daughter of Alexander II of Epirus; 4.Chryseis	(1) Antigonus III Doson king of Macedon; 229-221 BC	Echecrates
Prusias I of Bithynia	(1) Apama III	(4) Philip V king of Macedon; 221-179 BC	Polycratia of Argos	Antigonos
Prusias II of Bithynia king of Bithynia	Apame IV	(illeg.) Perseus king of Macedon; 179-168 BC	Laodice V daughter of Seleucus IV Philopator	Demetrius prince	Philippus prince
Alexander prince

== Coin gallery ==
Antigonid dynasty coins
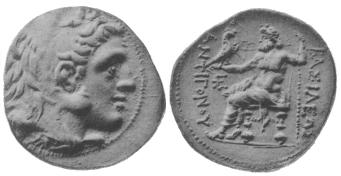
Coin of Antigonus I Monophthalmus ("the One-eyed") (382–301 BC).

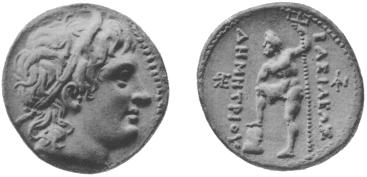
Coin of Demetrius I of Macedon ("The Besieger"), (337–283 BC), son of Antigonus I Monophthalmus

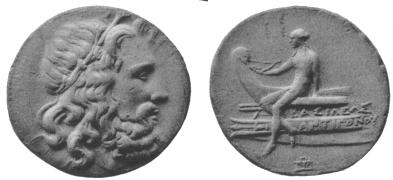
Coin of Antigonus II Gonatas

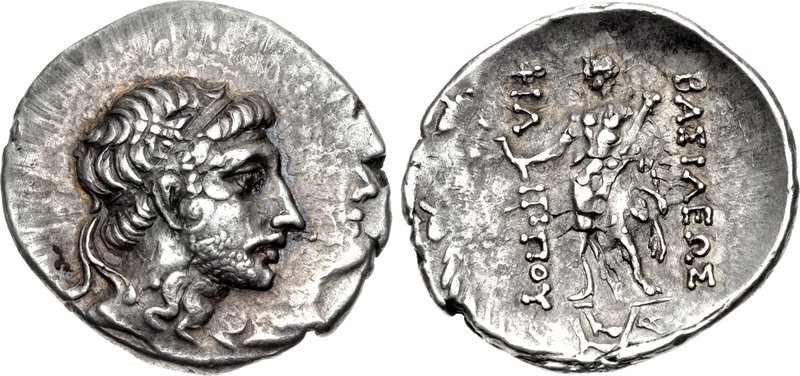
Coin of Philip VI Andriscus. Greek inscription reads ΒΑΣΙΛΕΩΣ ΦΙΛΙΠΠΟΥ (King Philip).

== See also ==
- List of kings of Macedon
