= Laodice V =

Seleucid princess

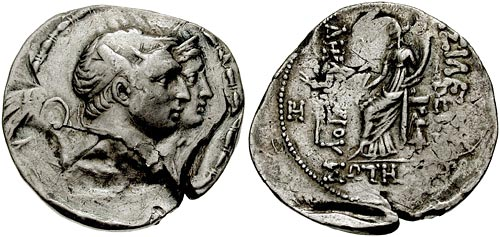
- Coin of Demetrius I with Laodice V (possible)

Queen consort of Macedon
- Tenure: 178/177 BC – 168 BC
- Coronation: 178 or 177 BC
- Predecessor: Polycratia
- Successor: Office abolished

Queen consort of the Seleucid Empire
- Tenure: 161 BC–150 BC (possible, unconfirmed)
- Predecessor: Laodice IV
- Successor: Apama or Cleopatra Thea
- Born: Seleucid Empire
- Died: 150 BC
- Spouse: Perseus of Macedon; Demetrius I Soter (possibly)
- Issue: With Perseus: Alexander; Philip; Andriscus (?); daughter; With Demetrius I: Demetrius II Nicator (possibly); Antiochus VII Sidetes (possibly); Antigonus (possibly)
- Dynasty: Seleucid
- Father: Seleucus IV Philopator
- Mother: Laodice IV

Laodice V (Greek: Λαοδίκη; flourished 2nd century BC, died 150 BC) was a Seleucid princess. Through marriage to Perseus king of Macedon she was a Queen of the ruling Antigonid dynasty in Macedonia and possibly later of the Seleucid dynasty.

== Biography ==
=== Family and early life ===
Laodice was a daughter of the Seleucid King Seleucus IV Philopator and his wife, Laodice IV. She had two brothers: Antiochus and Demetrius I Soter. She was born and raised in the Seleucid Empire.

=== Queen of Macedon ===
The Antigonid king of Macedon, Perseus had experienced considerable diplomatic successes in the Seleucid Empire, Greece and on the island of Rhodes. As a result of his diplomatic actions, he married Laodice, either in 178 BC or 177 BC, making Laodice queen of Macedon. Not much is known about her time as queen or her relationship with Perseus. However, Laodice bore Perseus at least four children: Alexander, Philip, Andriscus (?) and a daughter.

After a series of clashes with the Roman Republic, Perseus was finally decisively defeated by the Romans under Lucius Aemilius Paullus at the Battle of Pydna in 168 BC. Subsequently, Macedonia became a Roman province, while Perseus and his children became Roman captives and were taken to Rome, where they were shown as part of the triumph of Lucius Aemilius Paullus. At sometime between 165 and 162 BC, Perseus died, still in captivity. Little is known of the subsequent fate of the children of Perseus and Laodice. Only Alexander, who was still a child when Perseus was defeated by the Romans, is mentioned again. According to Livy, he was kept in custody at Alba Fucens, together with his father. After reaching his majority, Alexander became skillful in Toreutics, learned the Latin language, and became a public notary. The final defeat and captivity of Perseus and their children was the end of the Antigonid rule over Macedonia and its territories.

=== Later life ===
Unlike her husband, Laodice seems to have avoided captivity in Rome, and instead appears to have lived for much of the 160s in the court of her uncle, Antiochus IV Epiphanes and her half-brother Antiochus V Eupator. After their deaths, her brother Demetrius I Soter became Seleucid King. Demetrius I ruled from 161 BC to 150 BC. There is a possibility that Demetrius I married Laodice, but this is not certain. However, what is certain is that Demetrius' wife was named Laodice, and was the mother of his three sons Demetrius II Nicator, Antiochus VII Sidetes and Antigonus.

Around 160 BC, Demetrius I offered Laodice to their maternal first cousin Ariarathes V of Cappadocia in marriage, which Ariarathes V declined. In 158 BC, there was civil war in Cappadocia between Ariarathes V and his brother, Orophernes of Cappadocia. Demetrius, still upset of Ariarathes’ refusal, supported the rebel. However, by 156 BC, Ariarathes V had emerged as the victor of the Cappadocian civil war. By the summer of 152 BC, a usurper by the name of Alexander Balas, who claimed to be the son of Antiochus IV, was gaining support and momentum in his bid for the Seleucid throne. In a military campaign against Alexander Balas near Antioch, Demetrius I was defeated. In 150 BC, Laodice was killed along with Demetrius I.

== See also ==
- List of Syrian monarchs
- Timeline of Syrian history

== Sources ==
- "Laodice IV - Livius". Livius.org.
- "Laodice V - Livius". Livius.org.
- "Perseus - Livius". Livius.org.
- "Demetrius I Soter - Livius". Livius.org.
- J.D. Grainger, A Seleukid prosopography and gazetteer, BRILL 1997, ASIN: B01M6ZINFX

Laodice V Seleucid dynasty Born: Unknown Died: 150 BC
Royal titles
Preceded by Polycratia	Queen of Macedon; 178/177 BC–168 BC with Perseus of Macedon (179–168 BC)	Succeeded by Position abolished
Preceded by None or Apama	Seleucid Queen (Queen Consort of Syria) c. 161 BC–150 BC with Demetrius I Soter (161–150 BC)	Succeeded by Cleopatra Thea
