= Philippus (son of Philip V) =

Philippus (Greek: Φίλιππος) the son of Philip V, half-brother of Perseus Antigonid King of Macedon. He was adopted by his brother as his son. Even after the birth of the king's son, Alexander, Perseus treated him as his heir to the throne. Together they surrendered to the Romans ending the Third Macedonian War. He was led in triumph before the car of Lucius Aemilius Paullus and afterwards consigned to captivity at Alba Fucens, where he survived his adopted father a short time. He was only eighteen years old at the time of his death.
