= Hellenistic Greece =

Historical period of Greece following Classical Greece

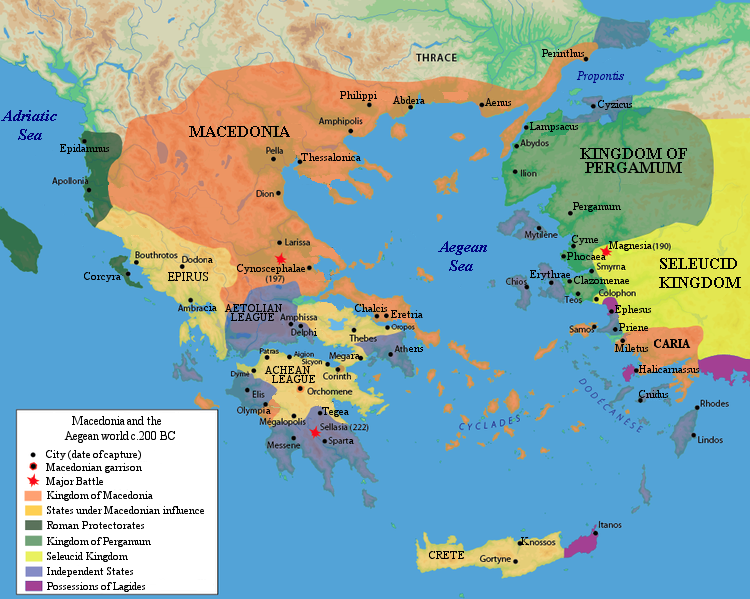
A map of Hellenistic Greece in 200 BC, with the Kingdom of Macedonia (orange) under Philip V (r. 221–179 BC), Macedonian dependent states (dark yellow), the Seleucid Empire (bright yellow), Roman protectorates (dark green), the Kingdom of Pergamon (light green), independent states (light purple), and possessions of the Ptolemaic Empire (violet purple)

Hellenistic Greece is the historical period of Ancient Greece following Classical Greece, between the death of Alexander the Great of Macedon and the Roman conquest of the Achaean League after the battle of Corinth in 146 BC, a crushing Roman victory in the Peloponnese that led to the destruction of Corinth and ushered in the period of Roman Greece. Hellenistic Greece's definitive end was with the Battle of Actium in 31 BC, when Octavian defeated Ptolemaic queen Cleopatra VII and Mark Antony, the next year taking over Alexandria, the last independent great center of the Hellenistic world.

The Hellenistic period began with the wars of the Diadochi, armed contests among the former generals of Alexander the Great to carve up his empire in Southeast Europe, West Asia, and North Africa. The wars lasted until 272 BC, witnessing the fall of both the Argead and Antipatrid dynasties of Macedonia in favor of the Antigonid dynasty. The era was also marked by successive wars between the Kingdom of Macedonia, the kingdom of Epirus, the Aetolian League, Achaean League, Sparta, Rhodes, kingdom of Pergamum as well as the Seleucid and Ptolemaic empires.

During the reign of Philip V of Macedon (r. 221–179 BC), the Macedonians not only lost the Cretan War (205–200 BC) to an alliance led by Rhodes, but their erstwhile alliance with Hannibal of Carthage also entangled them in the First and Second Macedonian War with ancient Rome. The perceived weakness of Macedonia in the aftermath of these conflicts encouraged Antiochus III the Great of the Seleucid Empire to invade mainland Greece, yet his defeat by the Romans at Thermopylae in 191 BC and Magnesia in 190 BC secured Rome's position as the leading military power in the region. Within roughly two decades after conquering Macedonia in 168 BC and Epirus in 167 BC, the Romans would eventually control the whole of Greece.

During the Hellenistic period the importance of Greece proper within the Greek-speaking world declined sharply. The great centers of Hellenistic culture were Alexandria and Antioch, capitals of Ptolemaic and Seleucid Kingdoms respectively. Cities such as Pergamon, Ephesus, Rhodes and Seleucia were also important, and increasing urbanisation of the Eastern Mediterranean was characteristic of the time.

== Hellenistic kingdoms ==
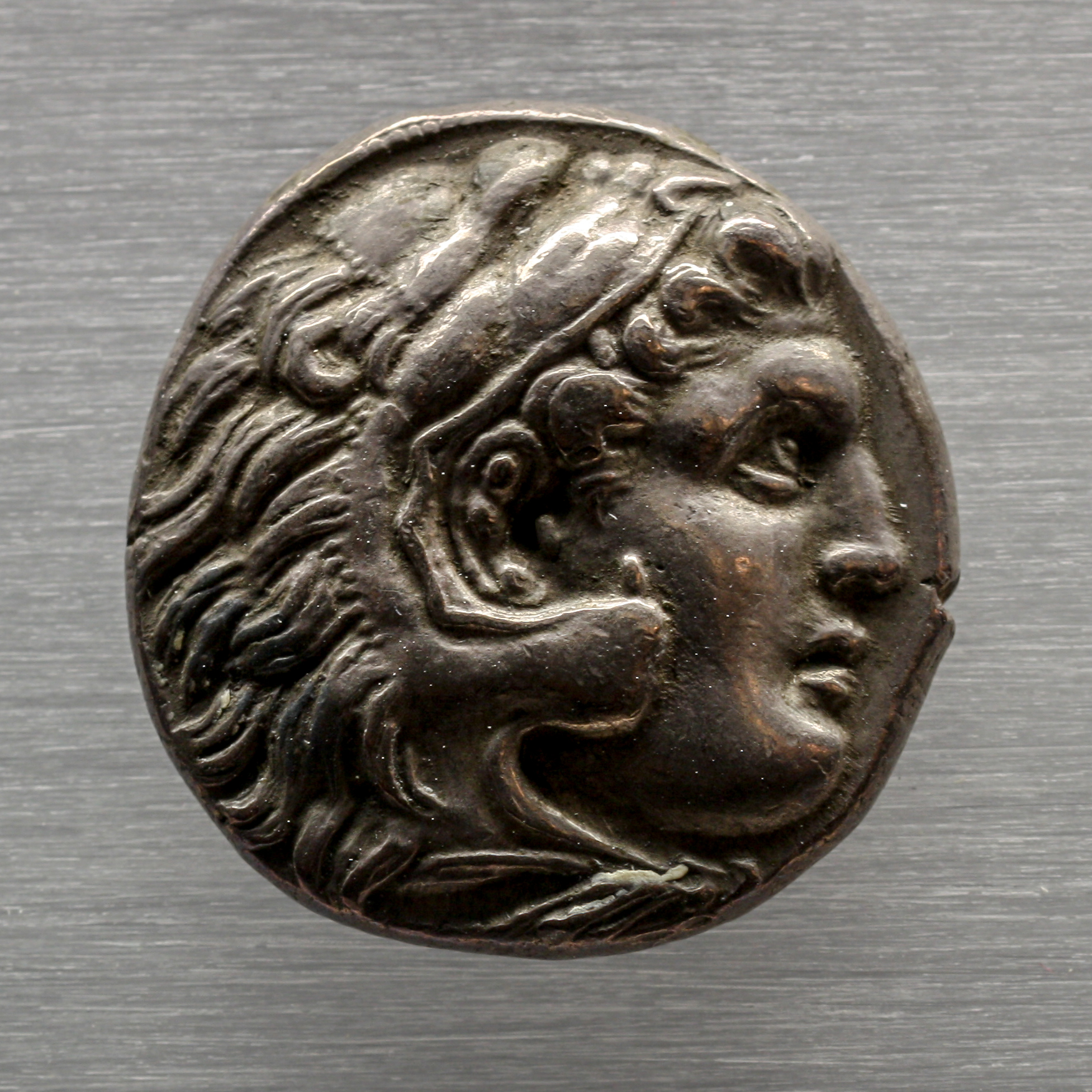
Coin depicting Cassander, first post-Argead leader of Hellenistic Greece and founder of Thessaloniki

The quests of Alexander had a number of consequences for the Greek city-states. It greatly widened the horizons of the Greeks, making the endless conflicts between the cities which had marked the 5th and 4th centuries BC seem petty and unimportant. It led to a steady emigration, particularly of the young and ambitious, to the new Greek empires in the east. Many Greeks migrated to Alexandria, Antioch and the many other new Hellenistic cities founded in Alexander's wake, as far away as what are now Afghanistan and Pakistan, where the Greco-Bactrian Kingdom and the Indo-Greek Kingdom survived until the end of the 1st century BC.

The defeat of the Greek city-states by Philip and Alexander also taught them that they could never again be powers in their own right, and that the hegemony of Macedon and its successor states could not be challenged unless the city states united, or at least federated. The Greeks valued their local independence too much to consider actual unification, but they made several attempts to form federations through which they could hope to reassert their independence.

Following Alexander's death a struggle for power broke out among his generals, which resulted in the break-up of his empire and the establishment of a number of new kingdoms. Macedon fell to Cassander, son of Alexander's leading general Antipater, who after several years of warfare made himself master of most of the rest of Greece. He founded a new Macedonian capital at Thessaloniki and was generally a constructive ruler.

Cassander's power was challenged by Antigonus, ruler of Anatolia, who promised the Greek cities that he would restore their freedom if they supported him. This led to successful revolts against Cassander's local rulers. In 307 BC, Antigonus's son Demetrius captured Athens and restored its democratic system, which had been suppressed by Alexander. But in 301 BC a coalition of Cassander and the other Hellenistic kings defeated Antigonus at the Battle of Ipsus, ending his challenge.

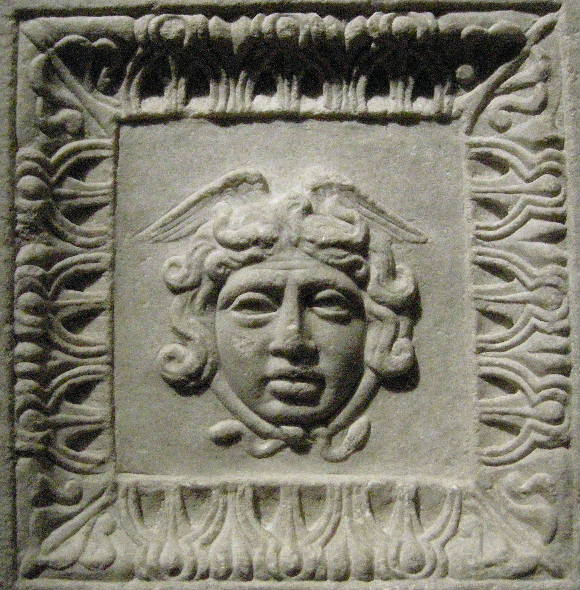
Hellenistic Greek tomb door bas relief, Leeds City Museum.

After Cassander's death in 298 BC, however, Demetrius seized the Macedonian throne and gained control of most of Greece. He was defeated by a second coalition of Greek rulers in 285 BC, and mastery of Greece passed to the king Lysimachus of Thrace. Lysimachus was in turn defeated and killed in 280 BC. The Macedonian throne then passed to Demetrius's son Antigonus II, who also defeated an invasion of the Greek lands by the Gauls, who at this time were living in the Balkans. The battle against the Gauls united the Antigonids of Macedon and the Seleucids of Asia, an alliance which was also directed against the wealthiest Hellenistic power, the Ptolemies of Egypt. The Epirote king Pyrrhus is known to have made Epirus a powerful state in the wider Hellenistic world (during 297–272 BC) that was comparable to the likes of Macedon and Ancient Rome. Pyrrhus' armies also attempted an assault against the state of Ancient Rome during their unsuccessful campaign in what is now modern-day Italy in 280-275 BC. Pyrrhus died in 272 BC leaving Antigonus Gonatas' Macedon the stronger power in Greece.

Antigonus II ruled until his death in 239 BC, and his family retained the Macedonian throne until it was abolished by the Romans in 146 BC. Their control over the Greek city states was intermittent, however, since other rulers, particularly the Ptolemies, subsidised anti-Macedonian parties in Greece to undermine the Antigonids' power. Antigonus placed a garrison at Corinth, the strategic centre of Greece, but Rhodes, Pergamum, Achaean League and Aetolian League and other Greek states retained substantial independence. Sparta also remained independent and generally refused to join any league.

In 267 BC, Ptolemy II persuaded the Greek cities to revolt against Antigonus, in what became the Chremonidean War, after the Athenian leader Chremonides. The cities were defeated and Athens lost her independence and her democratic institutions. The Aetolian League was restricted to the Peloponnese, but on being allowed to gain control of Thebes in 245 BC became a Macedonian ally. This marked the end of Athens as a political actor, although it remained the largest, wealthiest and most cultivated city in Greece. In 255 BC, Antigonus defeated the Ptolemaic fleet at Cos and brought the Aegean islands, except Rhodes, under his rule as well.

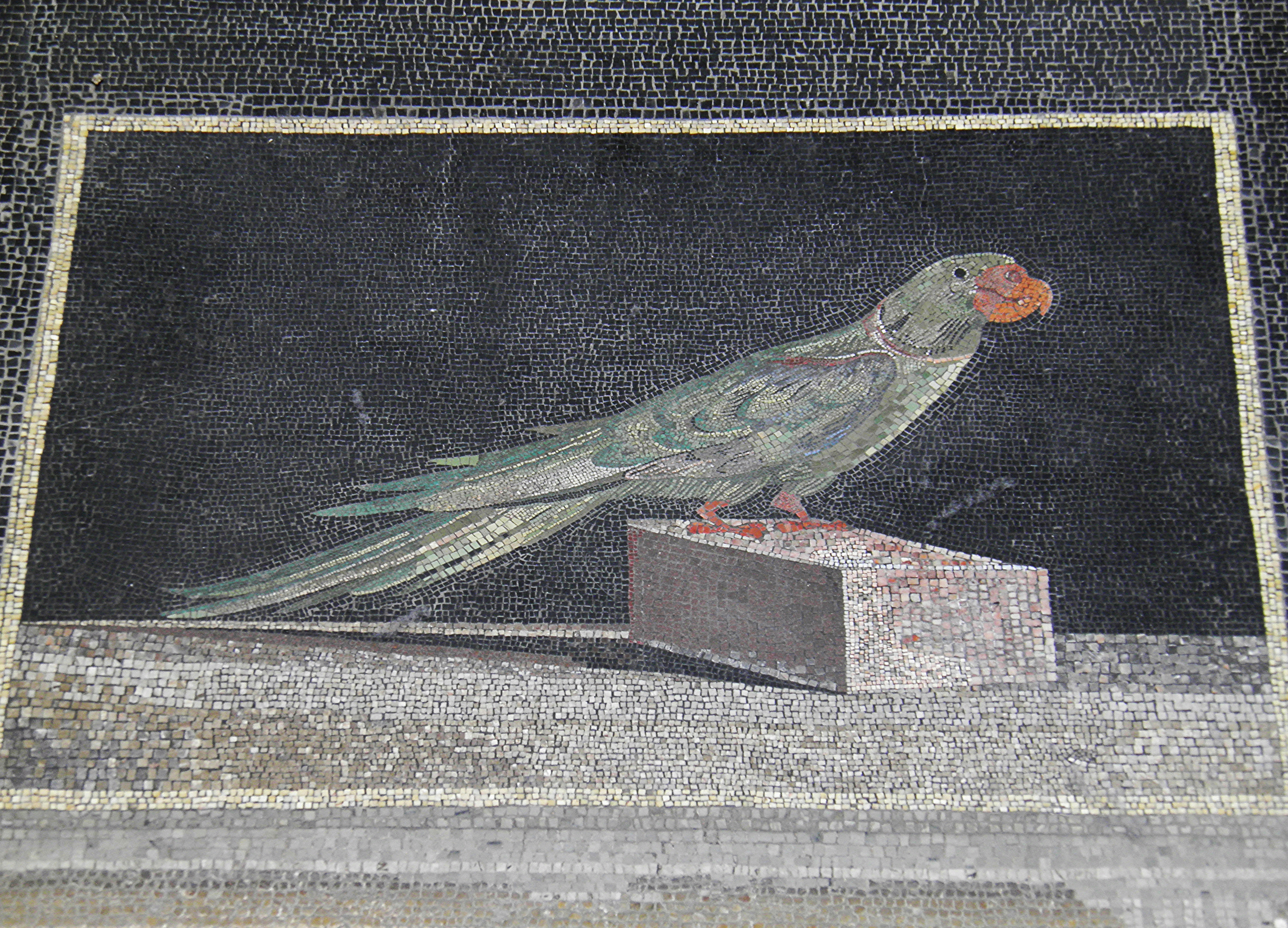
Detail of a Hellenistic mosaic floor panel showing an Alexandrine parakeet, from the acropolis of Pergamon (near modern Bergama, Turkey), dated to the middle of the 2nd century BC (during the reigns of Eumenes II and Attalus II of Pergamon)

== Polis and Leagues ==
In spite of their decreased political power and autonomy, the Greek city state or polis continued to be the basic form of political and social organization in Greece. Classical city states such as Athens and Ephesus grew and even thrived in this period. While warfare between Greek cities continued, the cities responded to the threat of the post Alexandrian Hellenistic states by banding together into alliances or becoming allies of a strong Hellenistic state which could come to its defense therefore making it asylos or inviolate to attack by other cities.

The Aetolians and the Achaeans developed strong federal states or leagues (koinon), which were governed by councils of city representatives and assemblies of league citizens. Initially ethnic leagues, these leagues later began to include cities outside of their traditional regions. The Achaean League eventually included all of the Peloponnese except Sparta, while the Aetolian League expanded into Phocis. During the third century BCE these leagues were able to defend themselves against Macedon and the Aetolian league defeated a Celtic invasion of Greece at Delphi.

After Alexander's death, Athens had been defeated by Antipater in the Lamian War and its port in the Piraeus housed a Macedonian garrison. To counter the power of Macedon under Cassander, Athens courted alliances with other Hellenistic rulers such as Antigonus I Monophthalmus, and in 307 Antigonus sent his son Demetrius to capture the city. After Demetrius captured Macedon, Athens became allied with Ptolemaic Egypt in an effort to gain its independence from Demetrius, and with Ptolemaic troops they managed to rebel and defeat Macedon in 287, though the Piraeus remained garrisoned. Athens fought more unsuccessful wars against Macedon with Ptolemaic aid such as the Chremonidean War. The Ptolemaic kingdom was now the city's main ally, supporting it with troops, monies and material in multiple conflicts. Athens rewarded the Ptolemaic Kingdom in 224/223 BC by naming the 13th phyle Ptolemais and establishing a religious cult called the Ptolemaia. Hellenistic Athens also saw the rise of New Comedy and the Hellenistic schools of philosophy such as Stoicism and Epicureanism. By the turn of the century, the Attalids in Pergamon became patrons and protectors of Athens as the Ptolemaic empire weakened. Athens would later also establish a cult for the Pergamene king Attalos I.

== Rise of Rome in the Hellenistic world ==
=== Antigonid hegemony in Greece ===
Antigonus II died in 239 BC. His death saw another revolt of the city-states of the Achaean League, whose dominant figure was Aratus of Sicyon. Antigonus's son Demetrius II died in 229 BC, leaving a child (Philip V) as king, with the general Antigonus Doson as regent. The Achaeans, while nominally subject to Ptolemy, were in effect independent, and controlled most of Peloponnese. Athens remained aloof from this conflict by common consent.

Sparta remained hostile to the Achaeans, and in 227 BC Sparta's king Cleomenes III invaded Achaea defeated the League. Aratus preferred distant Macedon to nearby Sparta, and allied himself with Doson, who in 222 BC defeated the Spartans at the battle of Sellasia.

=== Philip V against Rome ===
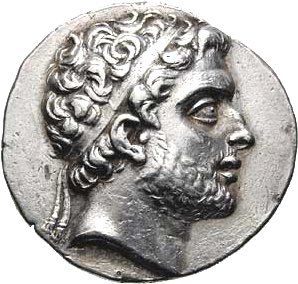
Philip V, "the darling of Hellas", wearing the royal diadem.

Philip V, who came to power when Doson died in 221 BC, was the last Macedonian ruler with both the talent and the opportunity to unite Greece and preserve its independence against the "cloud rising in the west": the ever-increasing power of Rome. He was known as "the darling of Hellas". Under his auspices the Peace of Naupactus (217 BC) brought conflict between Macedon and the Greek leagues to an end, and at this time he controlled all of Greece except Athens, Rhodes and Pergamum.

In 215 BC, however, Philip formed an alliance with Rome's enemy Carthage, which drew Rome directly into Greek affairs for the first time. Rome promptly lured the Achaean cities away from their nominal loyalty to Philip, and formed alliances with Rhodes and Pergamum, now the strongest power in Asia Minor. The First Macedonian War broke out in 212 BC, and ended inconclusively in 205 BC, but Macedon was now marked as an enemy of Rome. Rome's ally Rhodes gained control of the Aegean islands.

In 202 BC, Rome defeated Carthage, and was free to turn her attention eastwards, urged on by her Greek allies, Rhodes and Pergamum. In 198 BC, the Second Macedonian War broke out for obscure reasons, but very likely because Rome saw Macedon as a potential ally of the Seleucids, the greatest power in the east. Philip's allies in Greece deserted him and in 197 BC he was decisively defeated at the Cynoscephalae by the Roman proconsul Titus Quinctius Flamininus.

Luckily for the Greeks, Flamininus was a moderate man and an admirer of Greek culture. Philip had to surrender his fleet and become a Roman ally, but was otherwise spared. At the Isthmian Games in 196 BC, Flamininus declared all the Greek cities free, although Roman garrisons were placed at Corinth and Chalcis. But the freedom promised by Rome was an illusion. All the cities except Rhodes were enrolled in a new League which Rome ultimately controlled, and democracies were replaced by aristocratic regimes allied to Rome.

=== Antiochus III against Rome ===
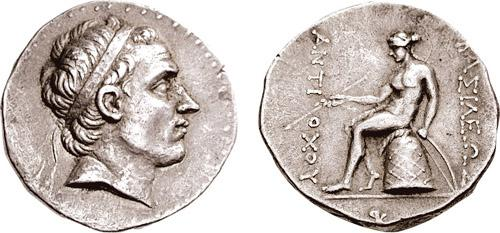
A tetradrachm of Antiochus III the Great (r. 222–187 BC), struck after 197 BC in Mesopotamia, a region of the Seleucid Empire

In 192 BC, war broke out between Rome and the Seleucid ruler Antiochus III. Antiochus invaded Greece with a 10,000 man army, and was elected the commander in chief of the Aetolians. Some Greek cities now thought of Antiochus as their saviour from Roman rule, but Macedon threw its lot in with Rome. In 191 BC, the Romans under Manius Acilius Glabrio routed him at Thermopylae and obliged him to withdraw to Asia. During the course of this war Roman troops moved into Asia for the first time, where they defeated Antiochus again at Magnesia on the Sipylum (190 BC). Greece now lay across Rome's line of communications with the east, and Roman soldiers became a permanent presence. The Peace of Apamaea (188 BC) left Rome in a dominant position throughout Greece.

During the following years Rome was drawn deeper into Greek politics, since the defeated party in any dispute appealed to Rome for help. Macedon was still independent, though nominally a Roman ally. When Philip V died in 179 BC, he was succeeded by his son Perseus, who like all the Macedonian kings dreamed of uniting the Greeks under Macedonian rule. Macedon was now too weak to achieve this objective, but Rome's ally Eumenes II of Pergamum persuaded Rome that Perseus was a potential threat to Rome's position.

== End of Greek independence ==
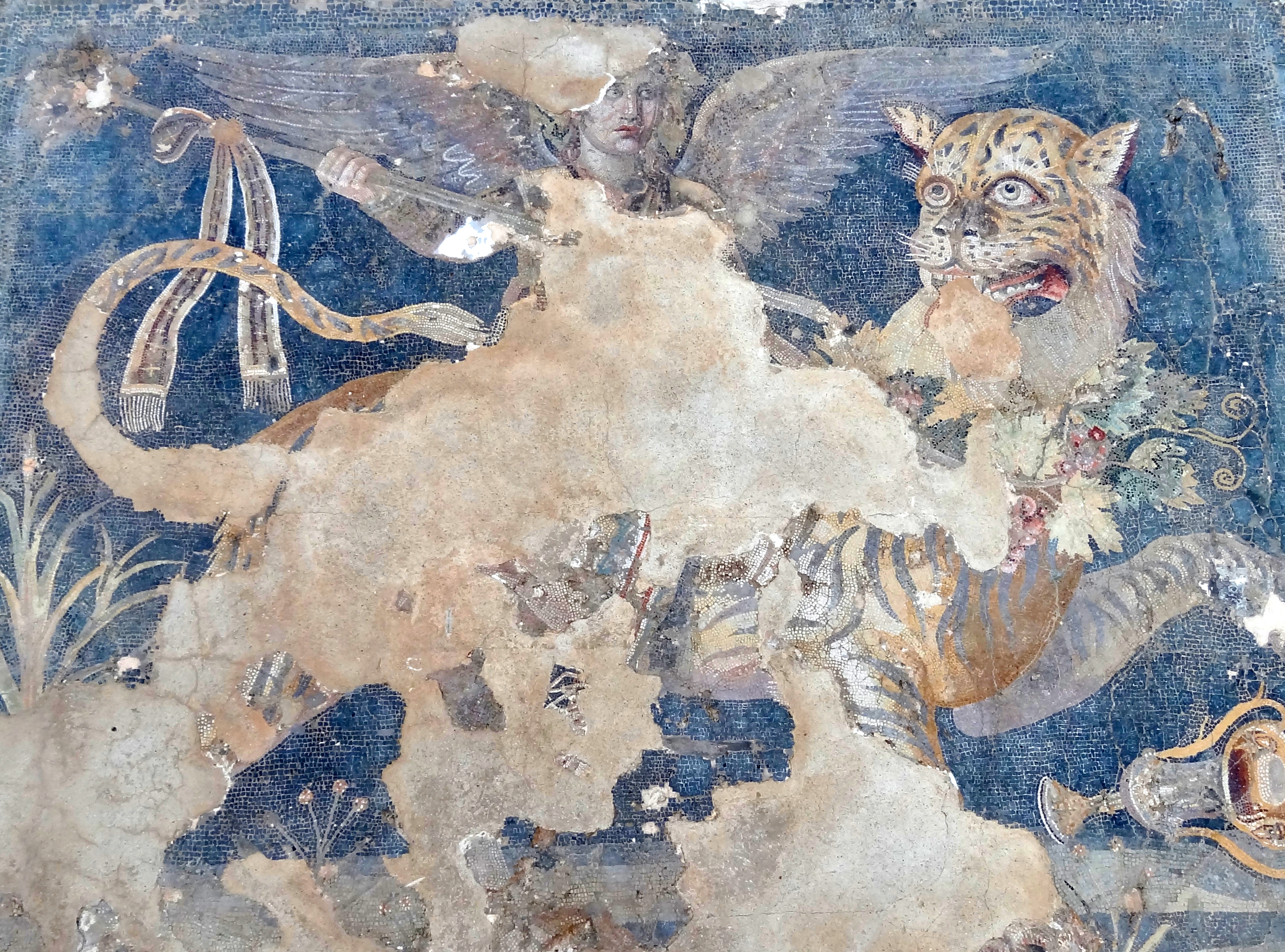
A Hellenistic Greek mosaic depicting the god Dionysos as a winged daimon riding on a tiger, from the House of Dionysos at Delos in the South Aegean region of Greece, late 2nd century BC, Archaeological Museum of Delos

As a result of Eumenes's intrigues Rome declared war on Macedon in 171 BC, bringing 100,000 troops into Greece. Macedon was no match for this army, and Perseus was unable to rally the other Greek states to his aid. Poor generalship by the Romans enabled him to hold out for three years, but in 168 BC the Romans sent Lucius Aemilius Paullus to Greece, and at Pydna the Macedonians were crushingly defeated. Perseus was captured and taken to Rome, the Macedonian kingdom was broken up into four smaller states, and all the Greek cities who aided her, even rhetorically, were punished. Even Rome's allies Rhodes and Pergamum effectively lost their independence.

Under the leadership of an adventurer called Andriscus, Macedon rebelled against Roman rule in 149 BC: as a result it was directly annexed the following year and became a Roman province, the first of the Greek states to suffer this fate. Rome now demanded that the Achaean League, the last stronghold of Greek independence, be dissolved. The Achaeans refused and, feeling that they might as well die fighting, declared war on Rome. Many Greek cities rallied to the Achaeans' side, while even slaves were freed to fight for Greek independence. The Roman consul Lucius Mummius advanced from Macedonia and defeated the Greeks at Corinth, which was razed to the ground.

In 146 BC, the Greek peninsula, though not the islands, became a Roman protectorate. Roman taxes were imposed, except in Athens and Sparta, and all the cities had to accept rule by Rome's local allies. In 133 BC, the last king of Pergamum died and left his kingdom to Rome: this brought most of the Aegean peninsula under direct Roman rule as part of the province of Asia.

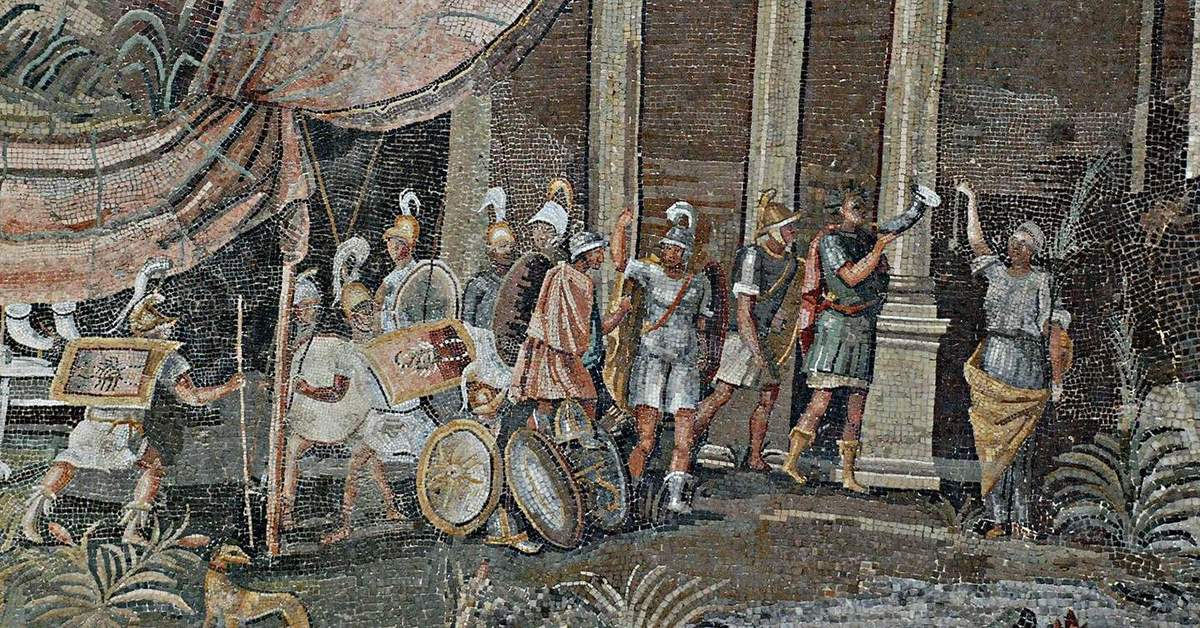
soldiers of the Ptolemaic kingdom, 100 BC, detail of the Nile mosaic of Palestrina.

The final downfall of Greece came in 88 BC, when King Mithridates of Pontus rebelled against Rome, and massacred up to 100,000 Romans and Roman allies across Asia Minor. Some Greek cities, more importantly Athens among them, overthrew their Roman puppet rulers and joined him. When he was driven out of Greece by the Roman general Lucius Cornelius Sulla, Roman vengeance fell upon the Greek cities allied to him. Mithridates was finally defeated by Gnaeus Pompeius Magnus (Pompey the Great) in 65 BC.

Further ruin was brought to Greece by the Roman civil wars, which were partly fought in Greece. Finally, in 27 BC, Augustus directly annexed Greece to the new Roman Empire as the province of Achaea. The struggles with Rome had left certain areas of Greece depopulated and demoralised. Nevertheless, Roman rule at least brought an end to warfare, and cities such as Athens, Corinth, Thessaloniki and Patras soon recovered their prosperity.

== See also ==
- Ancient Greek architecture
- Ancient Greek art
- Culture of ancient Greece
- Hellenization
