= Perseus of Macedon =

King of Macedonia from 179 to 168 BC

Perseus
- Basileus
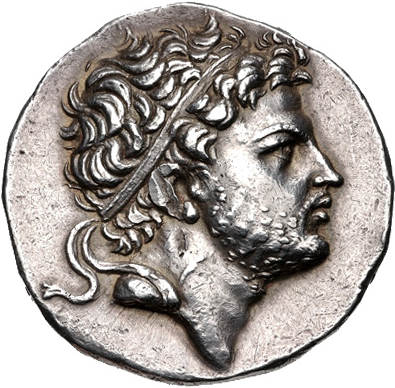
- Portrait of Perseus on the obverse of a tetradrachm

King of Macedonia
- Reign: 179–168 BC
- Predecessor: Philip V of Macedonia
- Successor: Monarchy abolished (Andriscus claimed in 149 BC)
- Born: 212 BC; Pella, Macedonia
- Died: 166 BC (aged 46); Alba Fucens, Italy, Roman Republic
- Spouse: Laodice V
- Issue: Alexander (son of Perseus)
- Greek: Περσεύς (Perseus)
- House: Antigonid dynasty
- Father: Philip V of Macedon
- Mother: Polycratia of Argos
- Religion: Greek polytheism

Perseus (Greek: Περσεύς, romanized: Perseús; c. 212 – 166 BC) was king of the ancient Kingdom of Macedonia. from 179 until 168 BC. He is widely regarded as the last king of Macedonia and the last ruler from the Antigonid dynasty, as his defeat by Rome at the Battle of Pydna during the Third Macedonian War effectively ended Macedonia as an independent political entity.

== Early life ==
Perseus was the son of king Philip V of Macedonia and a concubine, probably Polycratia of Argos. His father spent most of his reign attempting to maintain Macedonian hegemony over Greece against heavy Greek resistance and, in his later reign, against an expansionist Roman Republic. Philip V failed in this endeavor: following defeat in the Second Macedonian War he was compelled to accept Roman power in Greece, and later helped Rome in the War against Nabis (195 BC) and the Aetolian War (191–189 BC). Perseus is recorded as having commanded Macedonian troops in both the Second Macedonian War and the Aetolian War. Being a son of a concubine, Perseus feared that the throne might pass on to his legitimate younger brother Demetrius, who had been sent as a hostage to Rome following the Second Macedonian War and now led a pro-Roman faction within the Macedonian court. In 180 BC Perseus forged a letter supposedly from the Roman general Titus Quinctius Flamininus, which suggested that Demetrius was planning to overthrow Philip V. This successfully convinced Philip V to execute Demetrius. Philip died the next year and was succeeded by Perseus on 22 June 179 BC.

== Reign ==
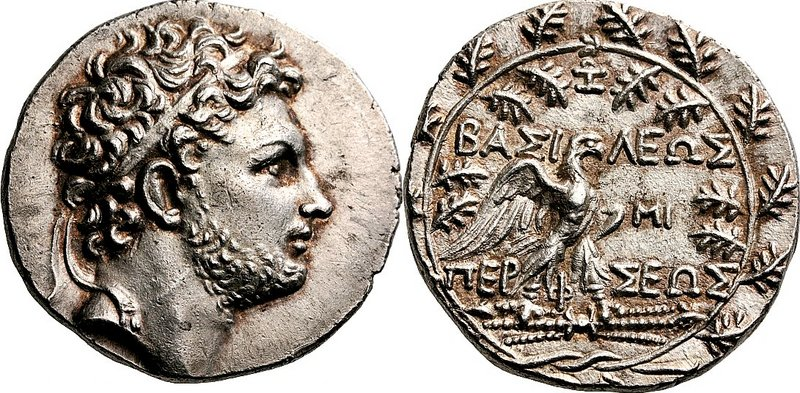
Tetradrachm of Perseus, minted between 179–172 BC at Pella or Amphipolis. The reverse depicts Zeus' eagle on a thunderbolt, with the legend ΒΑΣΙΛΕΩΣ ΠΕΡΣΕΩΣ ("Of king Perseus").

In 172 BC, Eumenes II of Pergamon, fearing the expansion of Macedonian power in the Eastern Mediterranean, gave a speech to the Roman Senate in which he accused Perseus of threatening the stability of the Greek world. Soon Rome and Perseus went to war in the Third Macedonian War (171–168 BC). Although Perseus had some initial success, the war ended with the King's surrender to the Roman general Lucius Aemilius Paullus after his decisive defeat at the Battle of Pydna, and his eventual imprisonment in Rome with his half-brother Philippus and son Alexander. Blaise Pascal mentions in his Pensées (Lafuma 15) that Perseus was blamed for not committing suicide, supposedly after his defeat at Pydna. The Antigonid kingdom was dissolved, and replaced with four republics. Perseus was led as a captive in the triumph of Paullus, then thrown in prison, where – according to Plutarch – after two years, the Romans decided to kill him, and had him kept from sleeping to the point that he died from exhaustion in 166 BC. Livy, however, writes that he was shown clemency, and kept in good conditions at Alba Fucens for the rest of his life.

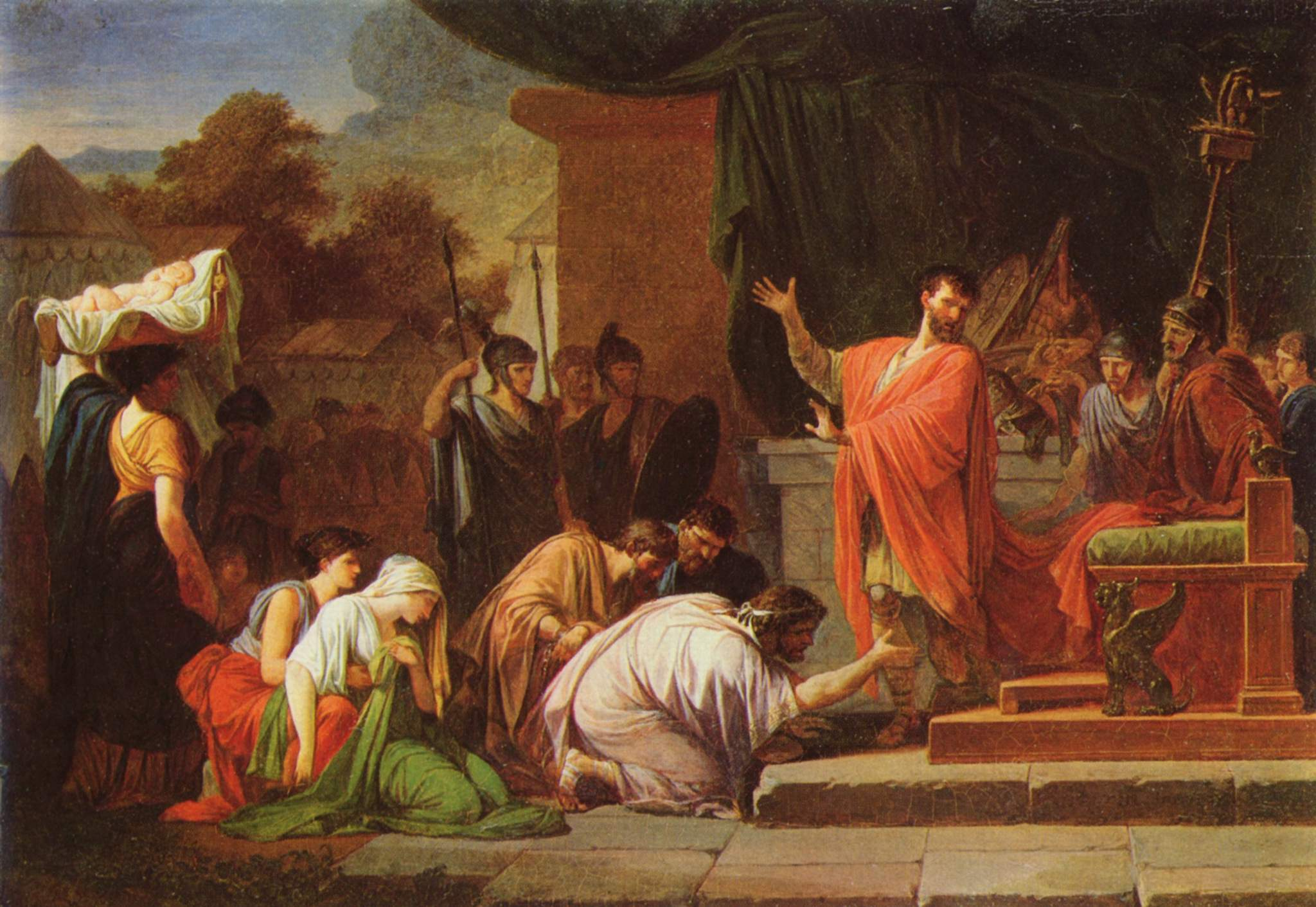
Perseus surrenders to Aemilius Paullus by Jean-François Pierre Peyron, ca. 1802.

In 178 BC, he had married Laodice V, the daughter of Seleucus IV from Syria. One son of Perseus and Laodice, Alexander, was still a child when Perseus was defeated by the Romans, and after the triumph of Aemilius Paullus in 167 BC, was kept in custody at Alba Fucens, together with his father. He became a skillful metalworker, learned the Latin language, and became a public notary.

== Legacy ==
Perseus of Macedonia on the march through the Thessalian gorges by Wilhelm Wägner, ca. 1877.

In 149 BC, Andriscus, claiming to be Perseus' son, announced his intention to retake Macedonia from the Romans. Over the course of about a year, he made an effort to challenge Roman rule, but was defeated by the Romans in 148 BC, thereby ending the reign of the last Macedonian king.

There was another claimant to the throne at this time, also claiming to be the son of Perseus. He was Pseudo-Alexander, who was defeated and his further fate is unknown.

In 146 BC, the four republics were dissolved, and Macedon officially became the Roman province of Macedonia.

== See also ==
- History of Macedonia (ancient kingdom)
- Macedonian Wars

== Bibliography ==
- Oliver D. Hoover, Handbook of Coins of Macedon and Its Neighbors. Part I: Macedon, Illyria, and Epeiros, Sixth to First Centuries BC [The Handbook of Greek Coinage Series, Volume 3], Lancaster/London, Classical Numismatic Group, 2016.

Perseus of Macedon Antigonid dynasty Born: c. 212 BC Died: 166 BC
Regnal titles
Preceded by Philip V	King of Macedon; 179–168 BC	Succeeded by Vacant; Four Roman client republics in Macedon; Andriscus claimed in 149 BC
