= Deidamia I of Epirus =

Epirote princess (d. 300 BC)

Deidamia Δηιδάμεια
- Born: Macedonia
- Died: 300 BC
- Spouse: Demetrius (m. c. 303 BC)
- Issue: Alexander
- Father: Aeacides
- Mother: Phthia

Deidamia (in Greek Δηιδάμεια; died 300 BC) was a princess of Epirus.

== Family ==
Deidamia was a daughter of Aeacides, king of Epirus and his wife, Queen Phthia, and sister of King Pyrrhus.

While yet a girl, she was betrothed by her father to Alexander IV, the son of Roxana and Alexander the Great, and having accompanied that prince and Olympias into Macedonia, she was besieged in Pydna (316 BC) together with them.

== Life ==
After the death of Alexander IV and Roxana in 309 BC, she was married to Demetrius Poliorcetes, at the time when the latter was endeavouring to establish his power in Greece, and thus became a bond of union between him and Pyrrhus.

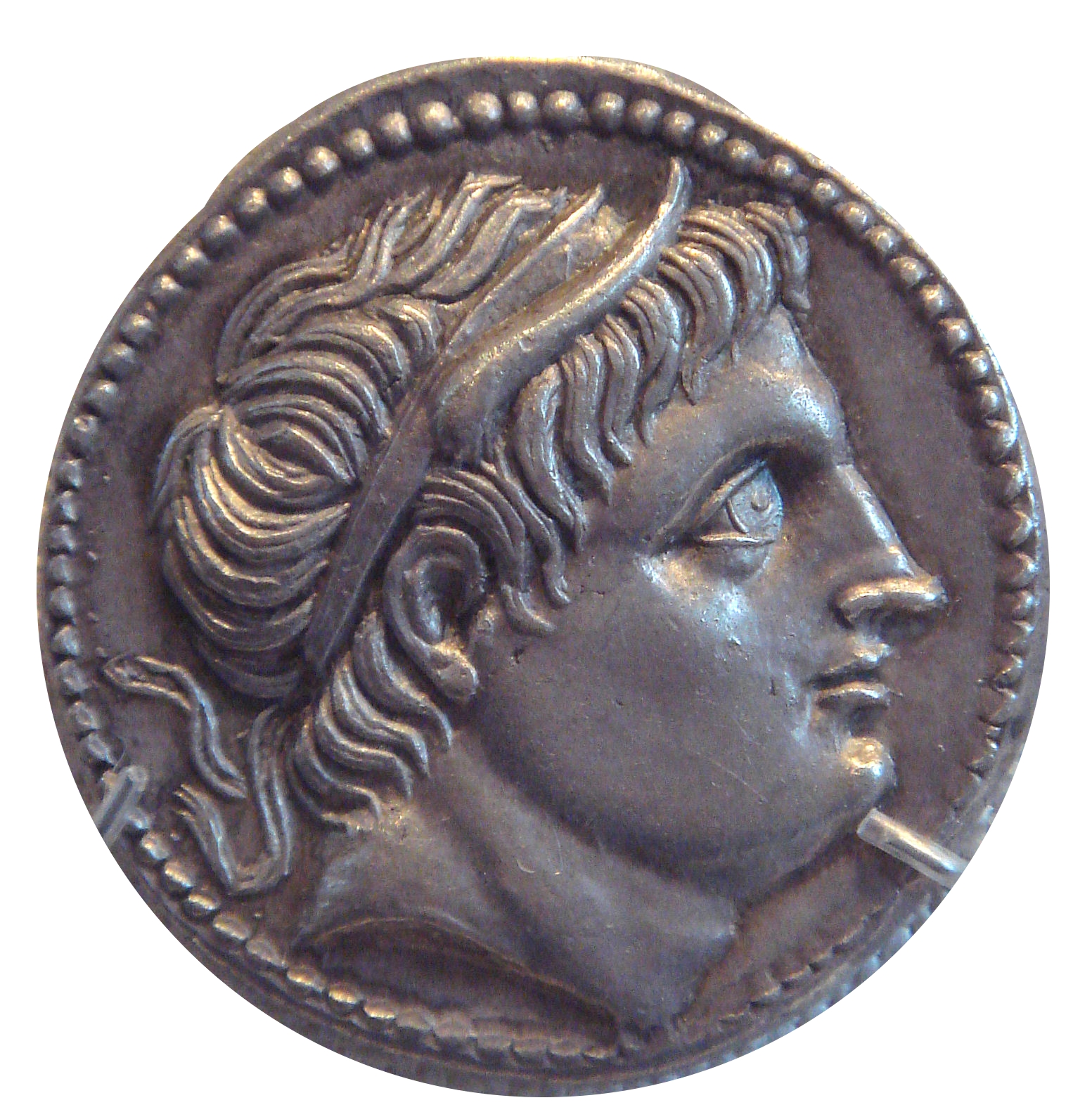
Deidamia's husband, Demetrius

When Demetrius proceeded to Asia to support his father Antigonus against the confederate kings, he left Deidamia at Athens; but after his defeat at Ipsus (301 BC), the Athenians sent her away to Megara, though still treating her with regal honours. She soon after repaired to Cilicia to join Demetrius, who had just given his daughter Stratonice in marriage to Seleucus, but had not been there long when she fell ill and died, 300 BC. She left one son by Demetrius, named Alexander, who is said by Plutarch to have spent his life in Egypt, probably in an honourable captivity.
