= Heliodorus (minister) =

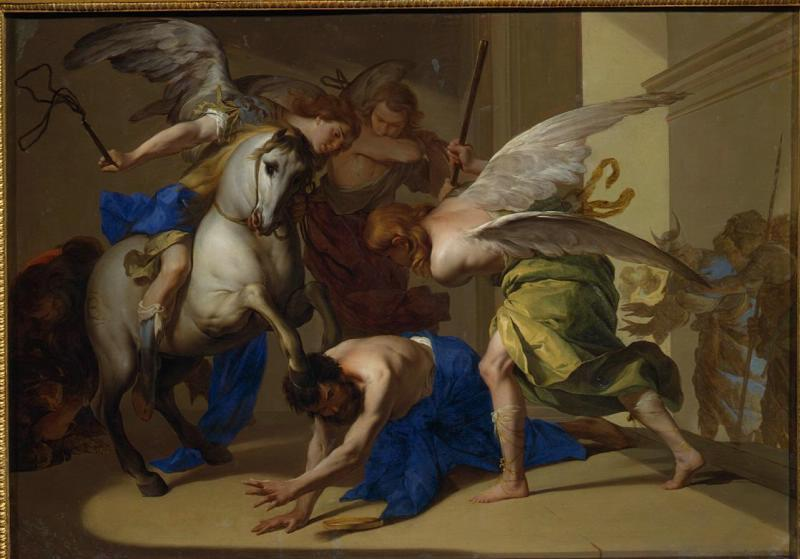
- The expulsion of Heliodorus from the temple, Bernardo Cavallino, c. 1674

Regent of the Seleucid Empire
- Regency: 175 BCE
- Predecessor: Seleucus IV Philopator
- Successor: Antiochus IV Epiphanes
- King and ward: Antiochus, son of Seleucus IV
- Died: 175 BCE (?)
- Occupation: Chancellor of Seleucus IV Philopator

Heliodorus (Greek: Ἡλιόδωρος) was a chancellor of Seleucus IV Philopator (reigned c. 187 BCE – 175 BCE). During his tenure, he is recorded as being involved with an attempt to tax the Temple in Jerusalem in Jewish histories of the period. Around 175 BCE, Seleucus IV died; some historical sources say that Heliodorus assassinated Seleucus. Regardless of whether he was responsible or not, he declared himself regent after the death and seized the power of the government for his own, hence the suspicions that he was at fault. Helidorus's regency was short-lived. The brother of the late king, Antiochus IV Epiphanes, was aided by the Pergamese monarch, Eumenes II, and arrived in Antioch. The Greek aristocracy favored Antiochus IV, and Heliodorus was overthrown.

== Biography ==
One of the main incidents recorded in Heliodorus's life is in the book of 2 Maccabees and possibly the Book of Daniel as well. The Seleucid Empire of the era suffered under the harsh indemnities imposed by the Treaty of Apamea: the Seleucids had to pay the Roman Republic a substantial amount of tribute each year to remain in compliance. This likely resulted in higher taxes and a general search for money by the government, which could be used to pay the Romans off. Around 178 BCE, Seleucus sent Heliodorus to Jerusalem to collect money, possibly after hearing rumors of wealth hidden in the Temple in Jerusalem. There may be a reference to this in Daniel 11:20, "He will send out a tax collector to maintain the royal splendor". 2 Maccabees Chapter 3 reports that Heliodorus entered the Temple in Jerusalem to take its treasure, but was turned back by spiritual beings who manifested themselves as human beings. Regardless of whether angels were responsible or not, it does seem that Heliodorus's tax-collecting mission failed, a fact which later Jews celebrated.

Inscriptions and papyri also mention a prominent official named Heliodorus; while the name was common enough, these still probably refer to the same person. The historian Appian's Syriaca mentions Heliodorus, albeit briefly. According to Appian, Heliodorus arranged the murder of king Seleucus. It is unknown if that is true, but regardless, he proclaimed himself regent after the king's death, ruling on behalf of a son of Seleucus IV named Antiochus who was too young to rule. (The eldest son, Demetrius, was a hostage in Rome at the time and thus not a political threat.) He served as regent for only months, however. Antiochus IV Epiphanes, the brother of the late king, had been in exile in Athens; with the help of the monarch of the Kingdom of Pergamon, Eumenes II, he returned to Antioch where he was quickly able to convince the Greek aristocracy to support his claim over Heliodorus's. However, there is skepticism that Appian's stray sentence is accurate or tells the whole story. The inscription OGIS 248 says that Seleucus merely "passed away" (implying a natural death). It is unclear if the phrasing of OGIS 248 was merely awkward and Seleucus was indeed murdered as Appian reported; it was only popular speculation of a murder that Appian reported as fact; or if Seleucus was murdered, yet this was partially covered up, leading to OGIS 248 and Appian diverging in their accounts.

Heliodorus's fate is unknown, but if he survived Antiochus's overthrow, presumably he was not invited to continue at the royal court, and more likely went into exile.

== Heliodorus stele ==
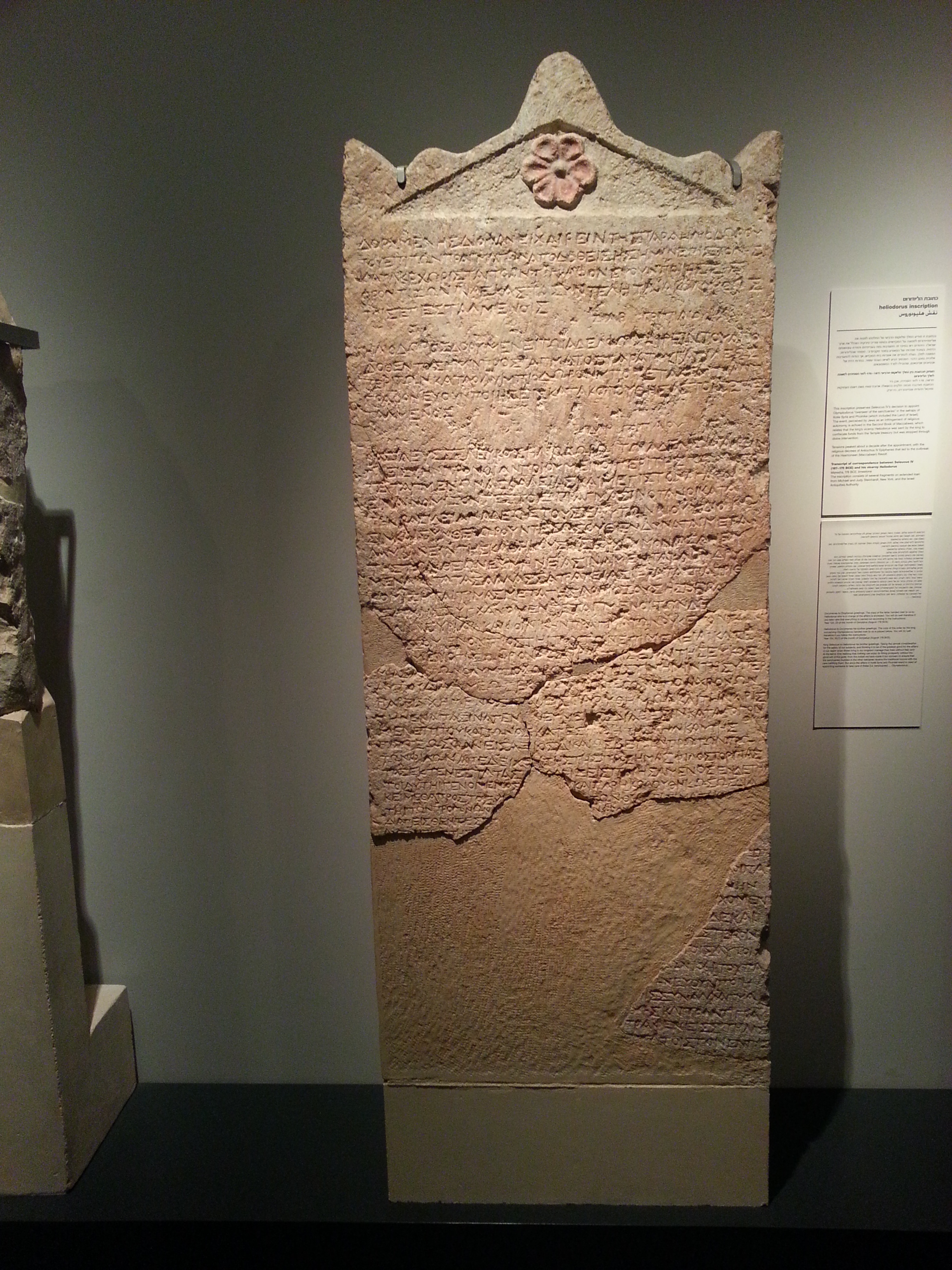
Heliodorus stele on display at the Israel Museum

In the 2000s, an ancient stele was discovered that referenced Heliodorus and his exact governmental role in a Greek inscription. It is a proclamation by Seleucus dated to 178 BCE. In the script on this stele, Seleucus informs Heliodorus that he appoints a man named Olympiodoros in charge of the temples of Coele-Syria and Phoenicia.

The stele is currently displayed in the Israel Museum in Jerusalem. While this part of the stele comes from the trade of antiquities, an additional fragment from the same stele was found in 2005 in an underground basement of a Hellenistic house in Maresha and it provides the missing portion of the inscription. The perfectly matched pieces have been reunited for display.

The stele was acquired by Michael Steinhardt in 2007 and then loaned to the Israel Museum. In December 2021, the "Heliodorus Stele" was among the 180 looted artifacts that Steinhardt agreed to surrender to the Manhattan District Attorney's office. As of January 7, 2022, the "Heliodorus Stele" was still on display in the Israel Museum.

== Heliodorus in fine art ==
During the Reformation and Counter-Reformation, the episode of Heliodorus being repulsed by angels from the Temple was taken in Roman Catholic apologetics as a symbol of the inviolability of Church property. For some time, it became a popular subject in works of artists, notably Raphael's 1512 work The Expulsion of Heliodorus from the Temple. Artists who depicted the incident include:

- Raphael (1512), Vatican, Palazzi Vaticani
- Wouter Crabeth (1566), Gouda (Holland), Sint Janskerk
- Bertholet Flémal (1662), Brussels (Belgium), Royal Museums of Fine Arts of Belgium
- Giuseppe Tortelli (1724), Brescia (Italy), Musei civici di Arte e Storia
- Francesco Solimena (1725), Naples (Italy), Gesù Nuovo
- Giambattista Tiepolo (1727), Verona (Italy), Museo di Castelvecchio
- Serafino Elmo (1734), Muro Leccese (Italy), Annunziata
- Franz Sigrist (1760), Zwiefalten (Germany), Klostenkirche
- Julius Schnorr von Karolsfeld (1860), Die Bibel in Bildern (Germany, Lutheran)
- Eugène Delacroix (1861), Paris (France), Saint Sulpice
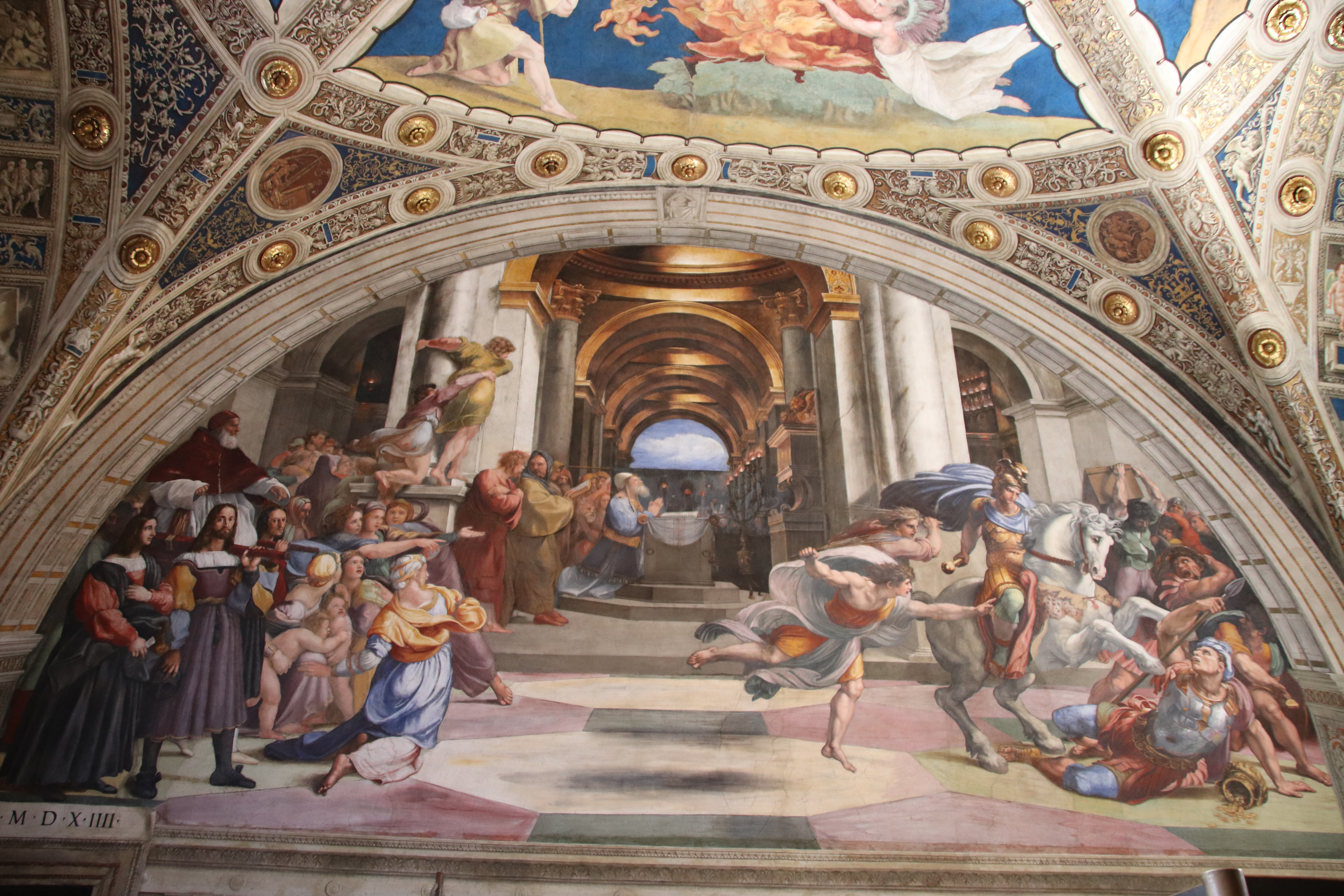
Mural in the Apostolic Palace of Vatican City by Raphael; 1511

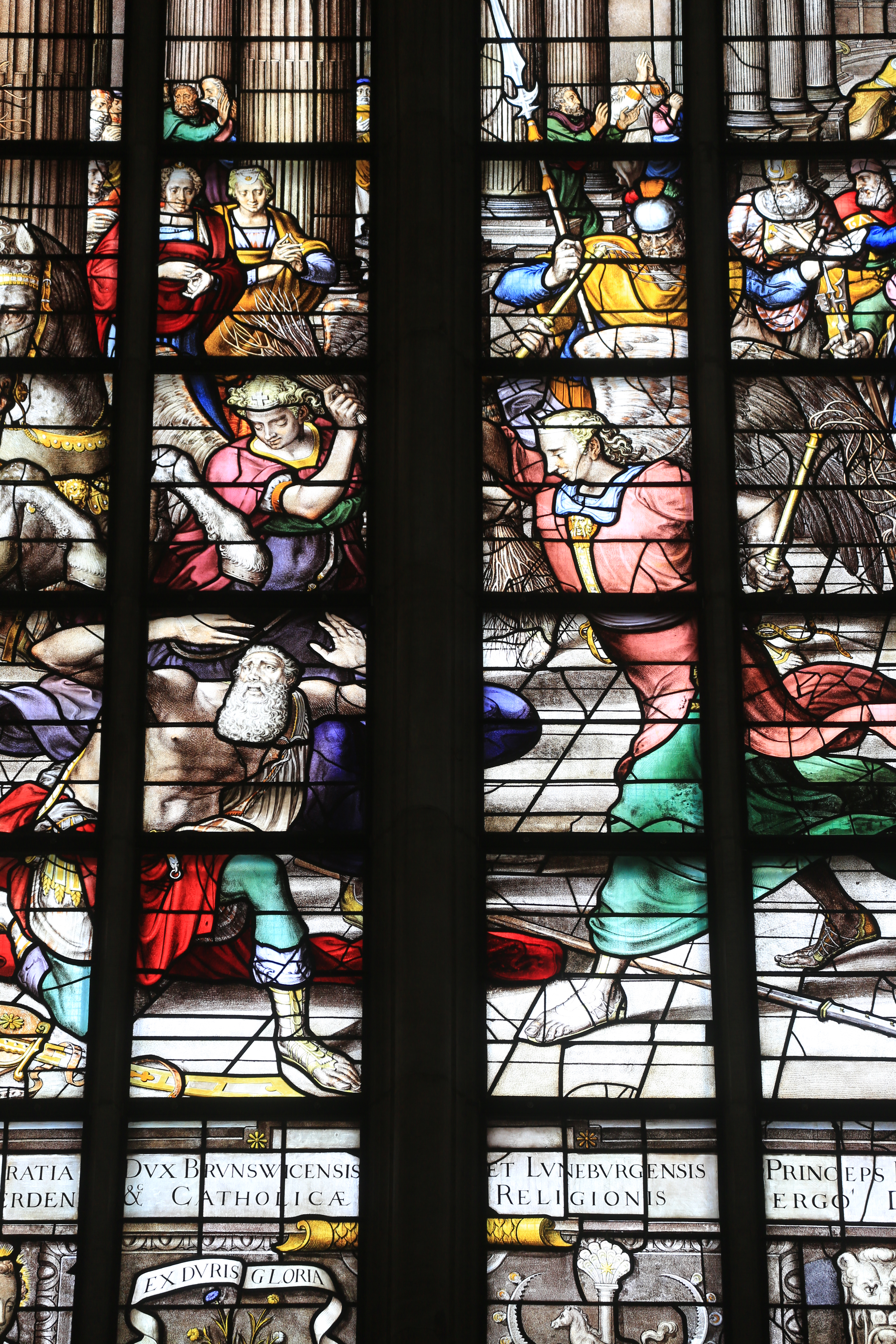
Detail of "The punishment of Heliodorus", stained glass at Sint Janskerk, Gouda, by Wouter Crabeth; 1566

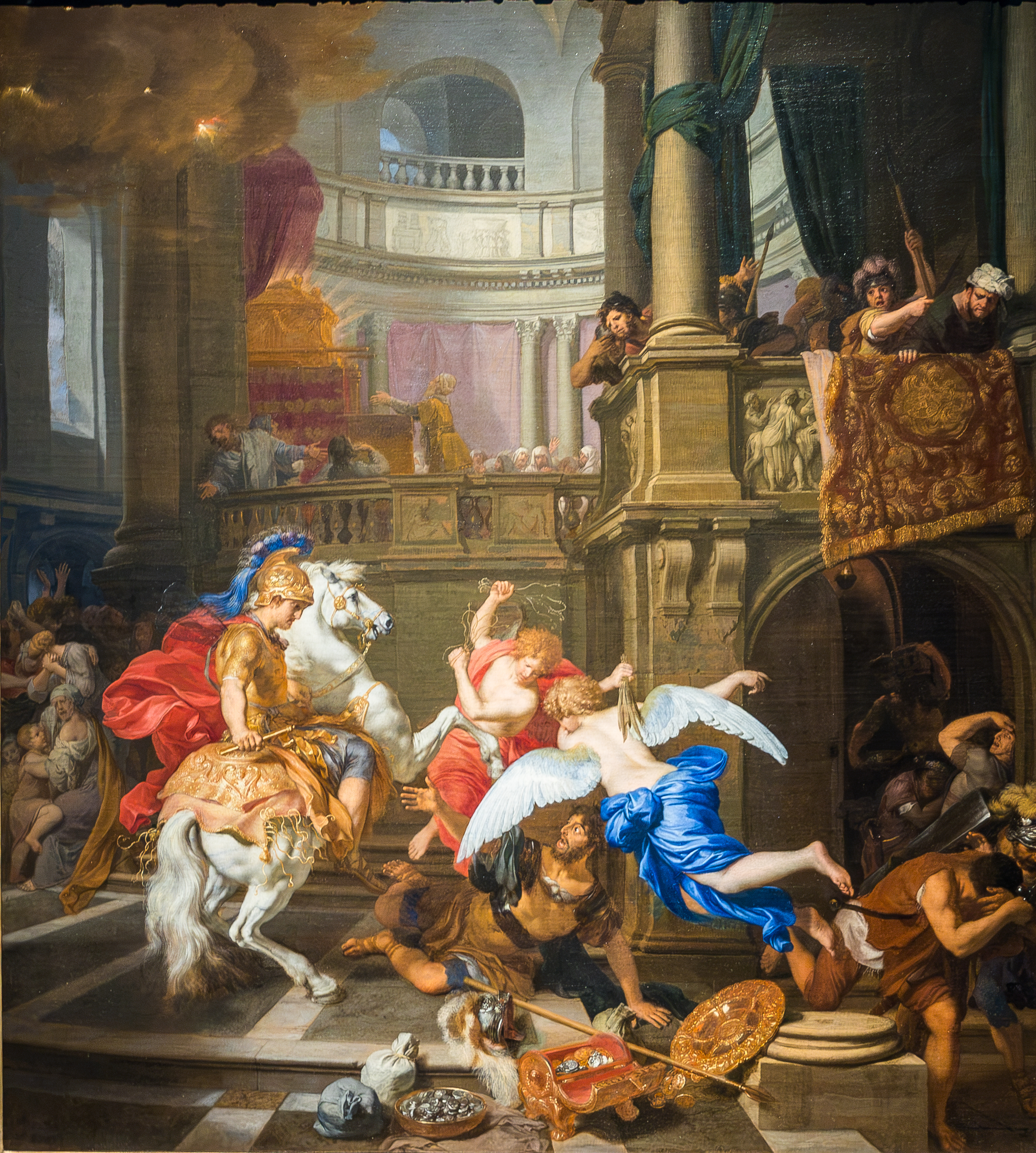
Expulsion of Heliodorus from the Temple, oil painting by Gerard de Lairesse; 1674

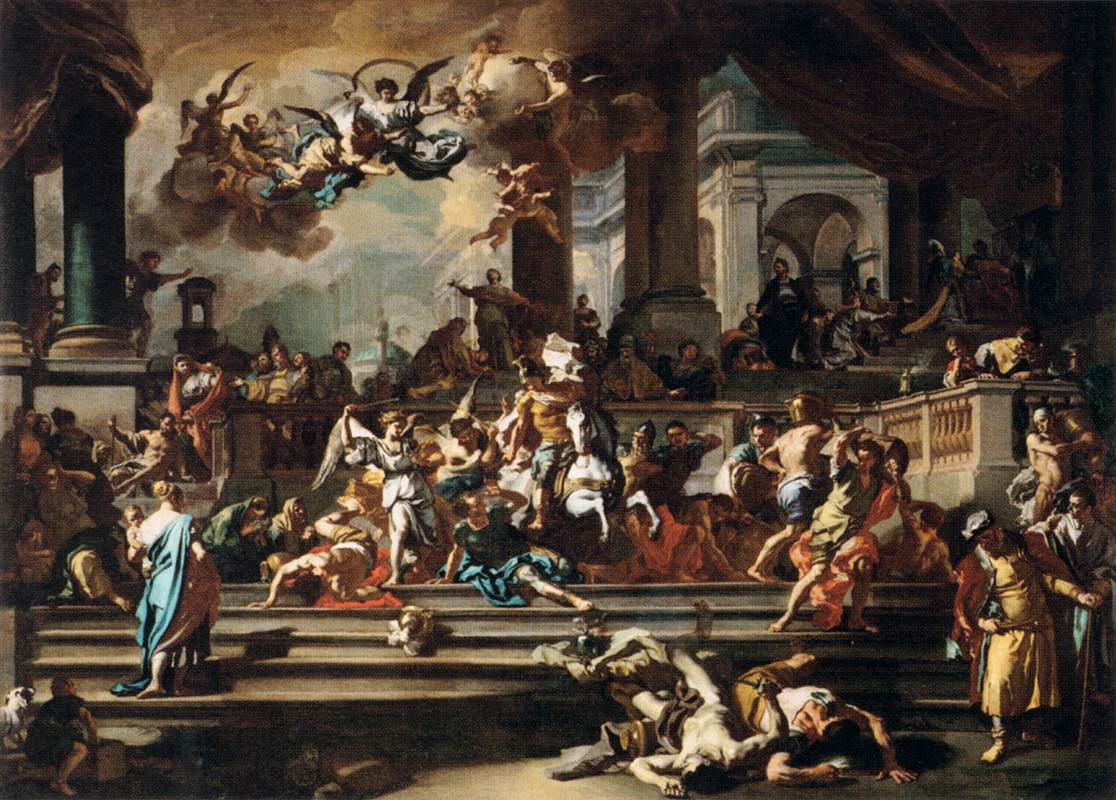
The Expulsion of Heliodorus from the Temple, oil painting by Francesco Solimena; c.1725

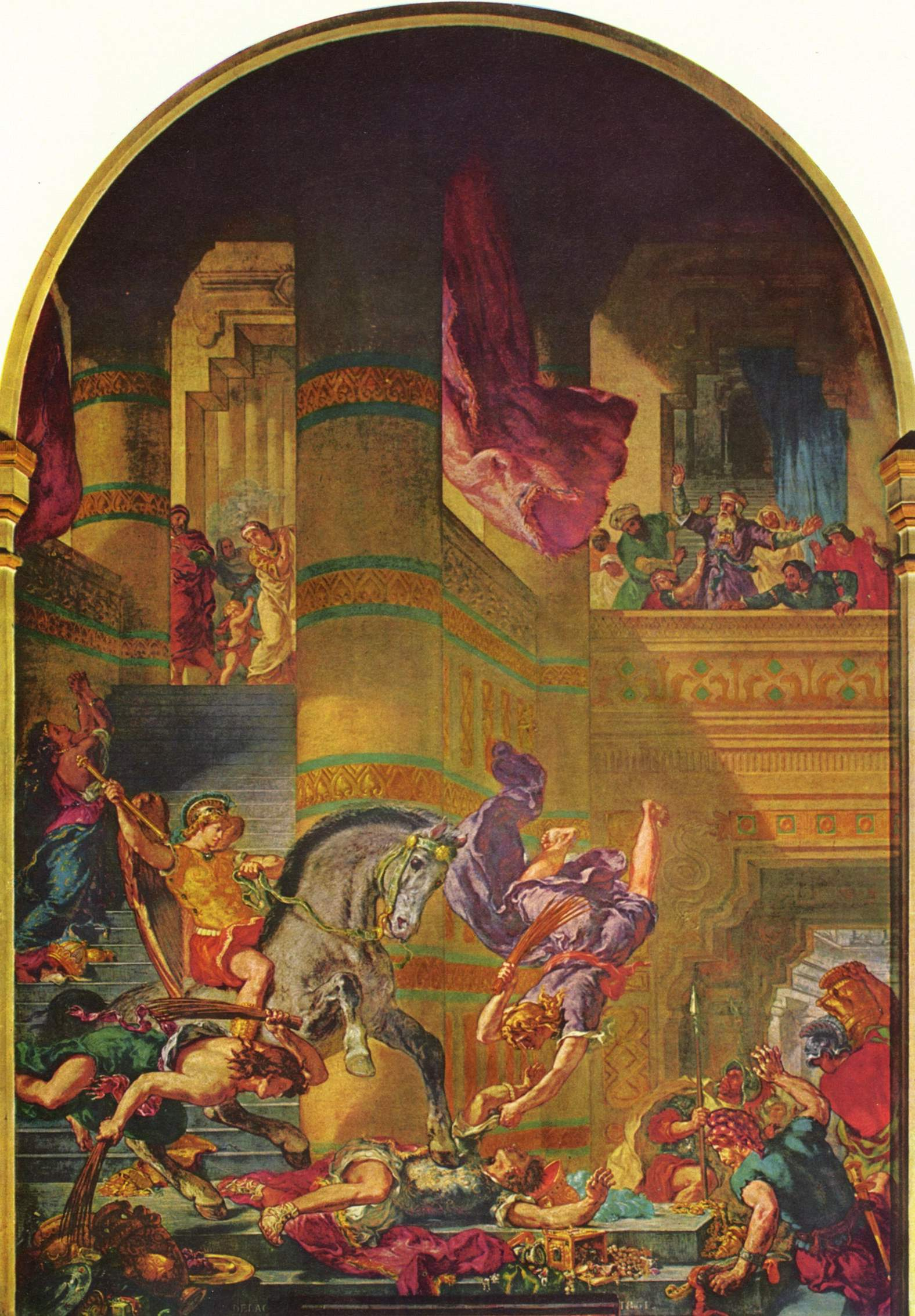
Héliodore chassé du Temple, mural in Saint-Sulpice, Paris by Eugène Delacroix; 1856–1861
