= Antiochus (son of Antiochus III the Great) =

Seleucid prince (221 BC–193 BC)

Joint King of the Seleucid Empire
- Reign: 210–193 BC
- Predecessor: Antiochus III the Great
- Successor: Antiochus III the Great
- Born: 221 BC
- Died: 193 BC
- Wife: Laodice IV (also sister)
- Issue: Nysa
- Dynasty: Seleucid
- Father: Antiochus III the Great
- Mother: Laodice III

Antiochus (221 BC–193 BC) was a Seleucid prince, first-born child to the Seleucid monarchs Antiochus III the Great and Laodice III, and his father's first heir.

== Biography ==
Antiochus was of Greek Macedonian and Persian descent. In 210 BC, his father made him joint king, when Antiochus III went off to the East on his great expedition. He was partly in command of the Seleucid army at the victory at Panion in 200 BC. He is not recorded to have had any real independent authority, but he was appointed viceroy of the eastern Seleucid satrapies. Antiochus is named in several decrees and letters with his father.

In 200 BC, Antiochus was present at the battle of Panium and received the command over the right wing of the cavalry; it was he who routed the Egyptian cavalry and attacked the Ptolemaic center from the rear with his victorious cavalry. In 196 BC, Antiochus was appointed as the heir to the Seleucid throne. In that year, his father arranged for him to marry his younger sister Laodice IV. The marriage between Laodice IV and Antiochus was the first sibling marriage to occur in the Seleucid dynasty. From their sibling union, Laodice IV bore Antiochus a daughter called Nysa.

In 193 BC, Antiochus III appointed his daughter, the sister-wife of his son, Antiochus, as the chief priestess of the state cult dedicated to their late mother Laodice III in Media. Later that year, Antiochus died. His family were in complete grief of his death, in particular Antiochus III. Antiochus was succeeded by his younger brother Seleucus IV Philopator.

== See also ==
- List of Syrian monarchs
- Timeline of Syrian history

== Sources ==
- J.D. Grainger, A Seleukid prosopography and gazetteer, BRILL, 1997
