= Philip V of Macedon =

King of Macedonia from 221 to 179 BC

Philip V
- Basileus
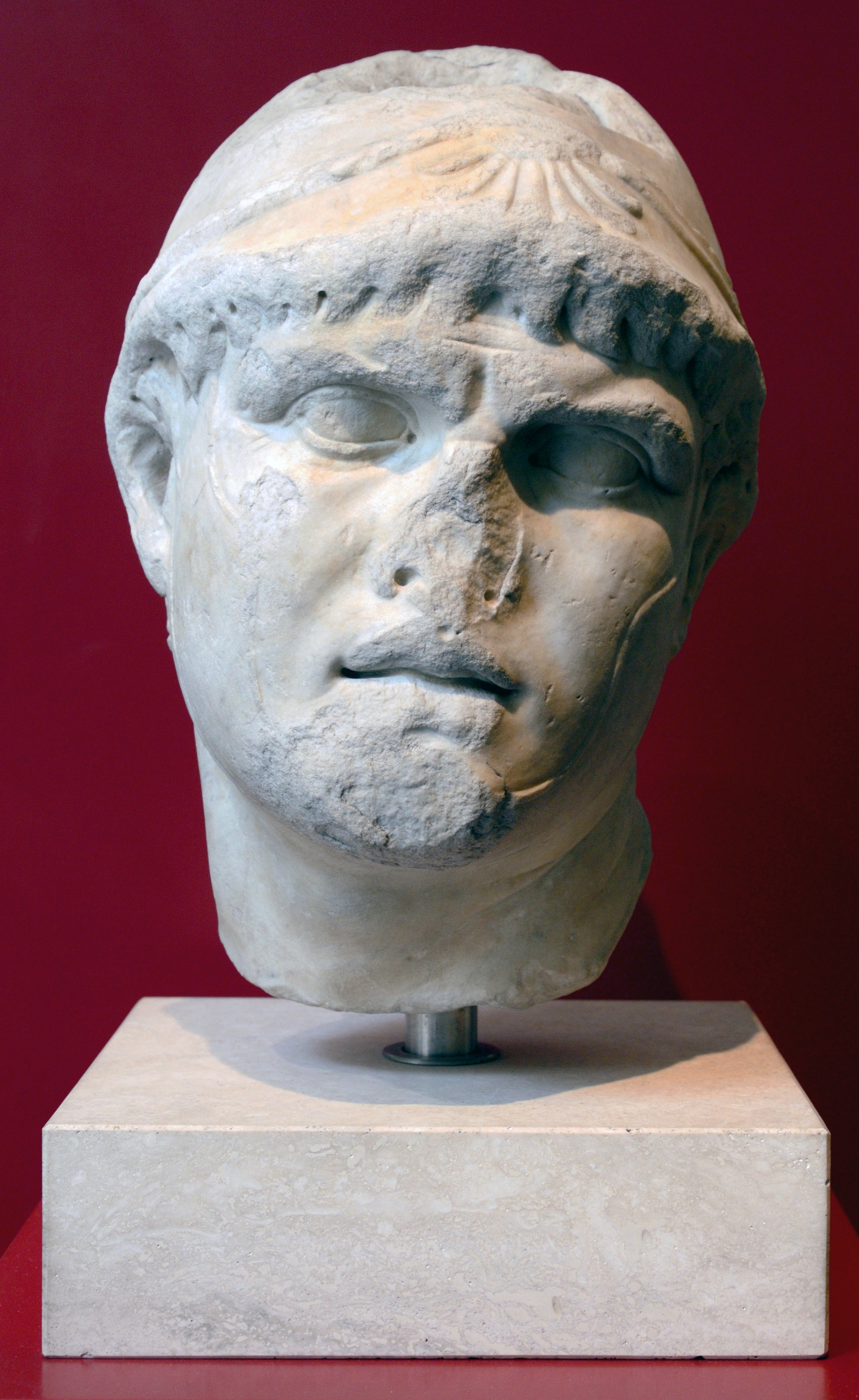
- Bust of Philip V inside the Palazzo Massimo, Rome.

King of Macedon
- Reign: 221–179 BC
- Predecessor: Antigonus III Doson
- Successor: Perseus
- Born: 238 BC; Pella, Macedonia
- Died: 179 BC (aged 59); Amphipolis, Macedonia
- Spouse: Polycratia
- Issue: Perseus; Apame IV; Demetrius; Philippus
- Greek: Φίλιππος (Philippos)
- House: Antigonid dynasty
- Father: Demetrius II Aetolicus
- Mother: Phthia of Macedon or Chryseis of Macedonia

Philip V (Greek: Φίλιππος, romanized: Philippos; 238 BC – 179 BC) was king of the ancient Greek kingdom of Macedon from 221 to 179 BC. Philip's reign was principally marked by the Social War in Greece (220-217 BC) and a struggle with the emerging power of the Roman Republic. He would lead Macedon against Rome in the First (212-205 BC) and Second (200-196 BC) Macedonian Wars. While he lost the latter, Philip later allied with Rome against Antiochus III in the Roman-Seleucid War. He died in 179 BC from illness after efforts to recover the military and economic condition of Macedonia and passed the throne onto his elder son, Perseus of Macedon.

== Early life ==
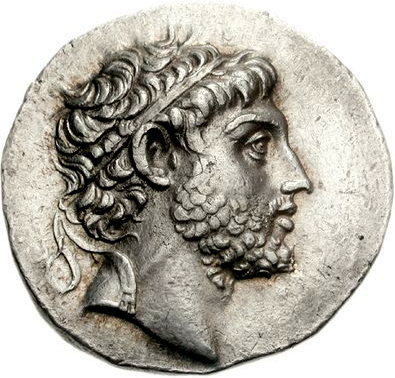
Tetradrachm of Philip V of Macedon

Philip was the son of Demetrius II of Macedon, and either Phthia of Macedon or Chryseis. Philip was nine years old when his father died in 229 BC. His elder paternal half-sister was Apama III. Philip's great-uncle, Antigonus III Doson, administered the kingdom as regent and then king until his death in 221 BC when Philip was seventeen years old (Plb. 4.2.5, 4.5.3-4; Just. 28.4.16, 29.1.1).

Philip was attractive and charismatic as a young man. A dashing and courageous warrior, he was compared to Alexander the Great, modelled himself on Philip II, and is said by Polybius to have become a universal beloved of the Greeks (κοινός τις...ἐρώμενος...τῶν Ἑλλήνων; Plb. 7.8.11) because of his benevolent conduct towards them. He had a close relationship with Aratus of Sicyon, who until 213 BC held a prestigious position at his court.

After ascending to the throne, in the first year of his reign Philip V pushed back the Dardani and other tribes in the north of Macedonia.

== The Social War ==
The Mediterranean world in 218 BC.

The Social War (220–217 BC) began following the establishment of the Hellenic League (Symmachy) of Greek federations (eventually including the Achaeans, Acarnanians, Boeotians, Euboeans, Magnesians, Messenians, and Thessalians) was assembled in Corinth in 224 BC at the instigation of Antigonus III Doson, the uncle and predecessor of Philip V. Philip took over leadership of the Hellenic League in 221/0 BC and led the Hellenic League on a three-year war against Aetolia, Sparta and Elis. Following the sack of Thermum, the Aetolian political and religious capital, the Aetolians agreed to peace. Philip's troops destroyed 2,000 statues and hauled away vast sums of treasure which included some fifteen thousand shields and suits of arms with which the Aetolians had decorated their stoas (Plb. 5.9). These shields were the arms taken from the enemies of the Aetolians during their previous military victories and included the shields of the Gauls who had raided Greece in the 3rd century BC.

Philip and his Greek allies in the Hellenic League ultimately claimed victory against the Aetolians, Spartans and Elians at the conference of Naupactus in 217 BC (Plb. 5.102-105). During the war, Philip V was able to stabilise and increase his own authority amongst his own ministers and became well-known and respected for his leadership and military prowess among the Greeks (Plb. 4.77.1-4; 5.104.4-11; 7.11.4-6).

== First Macedonian War (214–205 BC) ==
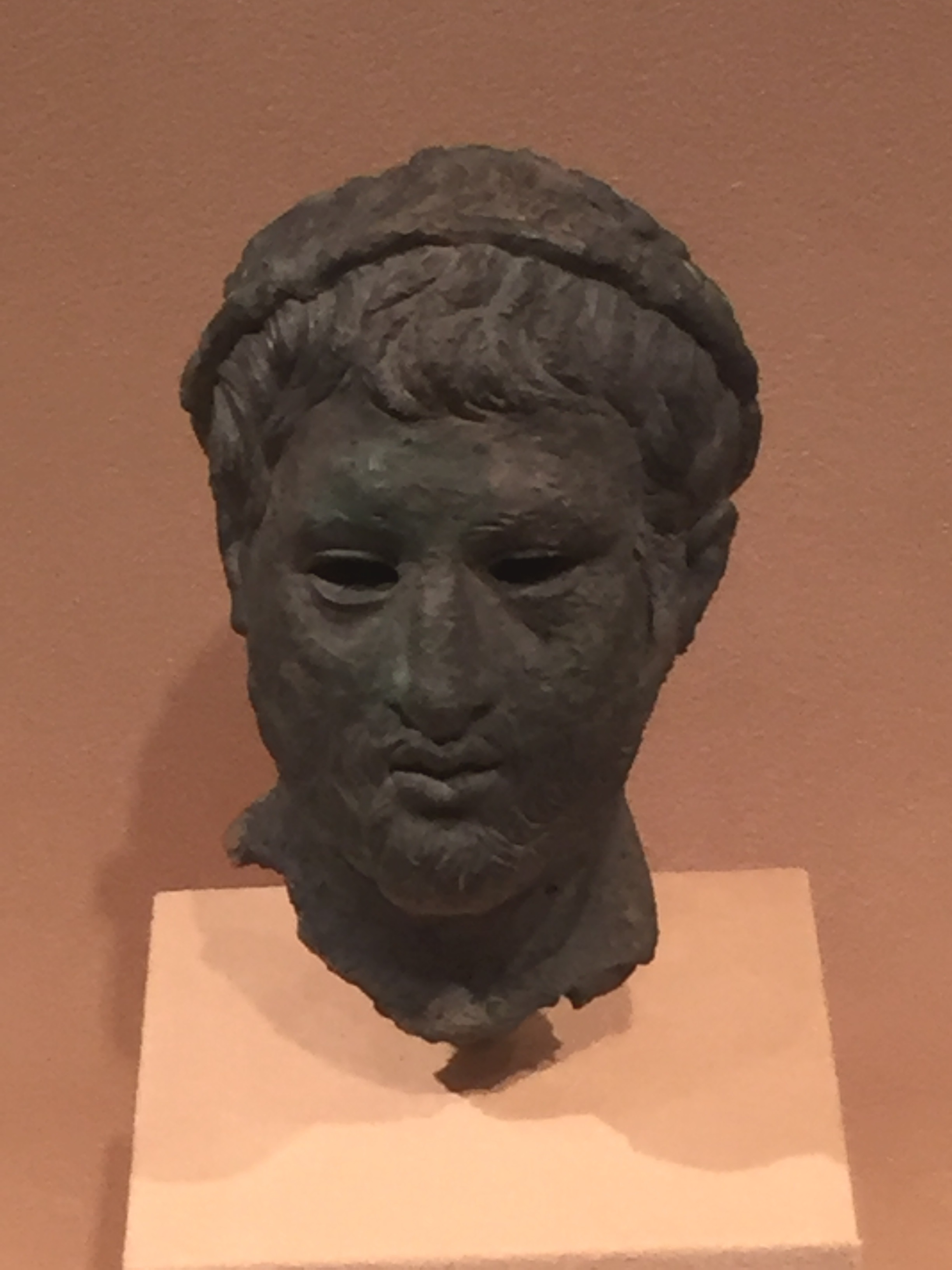
Hellenistic bust of a man wearing a laurel wreath, possibly a depiction of Philip V of Macedon, copper alloy, circa 200 BC, originally from Macedonia, now located in the Virginia Museum of Fine Arts, Richmond

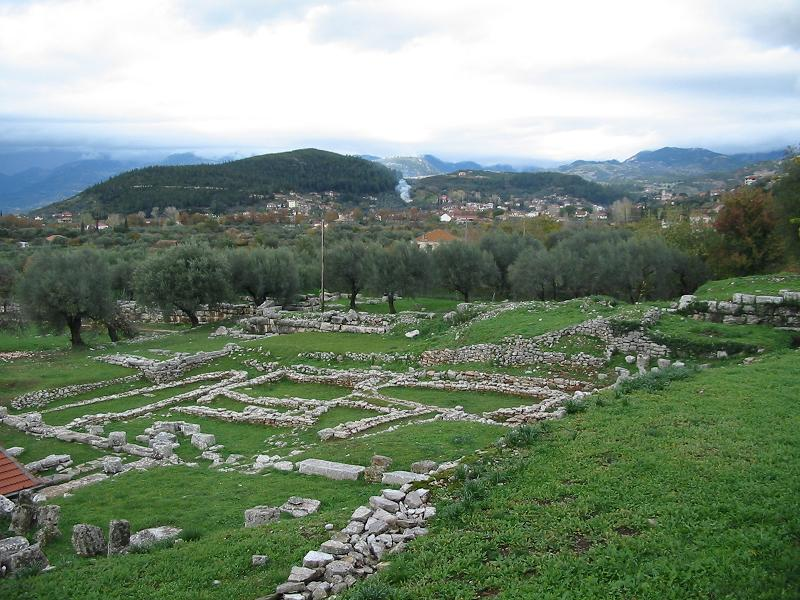
The ruins of Thermo capital of the Aetolian League, a town which was sacked by the army of Philip V.

After the Peace of Naupactus in 217 BC, Philip V tried to replace Roman influence along the eastern shore of the Adriatic Sea, forming alliances or lending patronage to certain island and coastal provinces such as Lato on Crete. He first tried to invade Illyria from the sea, but with limited success. His first expedition in 216 BC had to be aborted, while he suffered the loss of his whole fleet in a second expedition in 214 BC. A later expedition by land met with greater success when he captured Lissus in 212 BC.

In 215 BC, Philip V signed a Macedonian–Carthaginian Treaty with Hannibal Barca the Carthaginian general (Plb. 7.9; Livy 23.33, 38.7). Their treaty defined spheres of operation and interest, but achieved little of substance or value for either side. Philip V became heavily involved in assisting and protecting his allies from attacks from the Spartans, the Romans and their allies.

Rome's alliance with the Aetolian League in 211 BC effectively neutralised Philip's advantage on land (Livy 26.24.6-11). The intervention of Attalus I of Pergamum on the Roman side further exposed Philip's position in Macedonia. Philip was able to take advantage of the withdrawal of Attalus from the Greek mainland in 207 BC, along with Roman inactivity and the increasing role of Philopoemen, the strategos of the Achaean League. Philip and his troops sacked Thermum, the religious and political centre of Aetolia for the second time, destroying any remaining structures (Plb. 11.7.2), and the king was able to force the Aetolians to accept his terms in 206 BC. The following year (205 BC) he was able to conclude the Peace of Phoenice with Rome and its allies (Livy 29.12.14).

== Expansion in the Aegean ==
Following an agreement with the Seleucid king Antiochus III to capture Egyptian-held territory from the boy king Ptolemy V (Plb. 15.20), Philip invaded their territories in Asia Minor, besieging Samos and capturing Miletus. This expansion of Macedonian influence created alarm in a number of neighbouring states, including Attalid Pergamum and Rhodes. Philip responded by ravaging Attalid territory and destroying the temples outside the walls of Pergamon (Diodorus XXVIII 5). Their navies clashed with Philip's off Chios and Lade (near Miletus) in 201 BC during the Cretan war. Philip then invaded Caria. Although the Rhodians and Attalids successfully blockaded his fleet at Bargylia, they nevertheless sent an appeal to the Romans for help. At around the same time, the Romans finally defeated Carthage. Although very little in Philip's recent actions in Thrace and Asia Minor could be said to concern the Roman Republic directly, the Senate passed a decree supporting Pergamum and Rhodes and Marcus Valerius Laevinus was sent to investigate (Livy 31.3). Simultaneously, Philip's relationship with Athens suddenly deteriorated. The Acarnanian League launched a raid on Attica, aided by troops which they had received from Philip V. Attalus I and Rhodes convinced the Athenians to declare war on Macedon and Philip dispatched a force of 2,000 infantry and 200 cavalry under the command of Philokles to invade Attica and place the city of Athens under siege (Livy 31.14-16).

== Second Macedonian War ==
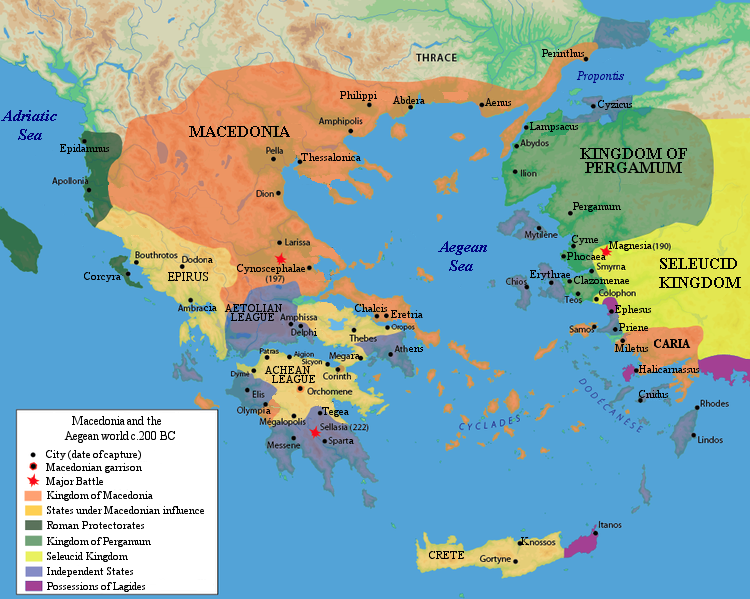
Kingdom of Macedon on the eve of the Second Macedonian War, c. 200 BC.

In light of reports from Laevinus and further embassies from Pergamon, Rhodes, and Athens, Publius Sulpicius Galba, one of the consuls for 200 BC was tasked with resolving the troubles in Macedonia. He organised a formal declaration of war in March (Livy 31.4-8) then recruited troops, and crossed the Adriatic in autumn (Livy 31.12-14). Meanwhile, Philip was besieging Abydos in the Hellespont. During the siege of Abydos, in the autumn of 200 BC, Philip was met by Marcus Aemilius Lepidus, a Roman ambassador on his way back from Egypt, who urged him not to attack any Greek state or to seize any territory belonging to Ptolemy and to go to arbitration with Rhodes and Pergamon. Philip protested that he was not in violation of any of the terms of the Peace of Phoenice, but in vain. As he returned to Macedonia after the fall of Abydos, he learnt of the landing of Sulpicius' force in Epirus.

=== Campaigns against Sulpicius ===
Gaius Claudius Centho was sent with 20 ships and 1,000 men to aid the Athenians, then led a surprise raid on the city of Chalcis in Euboea, one of the key Antigonid strongholds known as the 'fetters of Greece'. Philip rushed to Chalcis with a force of 5,000 men and 300 cavalry. Finding that Claudius had already withdrawn, he sped on towards Athens, where he defeated the Athenian and Attalid troops in a battle outside the Dipylon Gate and encamped at Cynosarges, made a series of unsuccessful assaults on Eleusis, Piraeus, and Athens. Then he ravaged the sanctuaries throughout Attica and withdrew to Boeotia. The damage to the rural and deme sanctuaries of Attica was severe and marked the permanent end of their use.

Over the winter of 200-199 BC, the diplomatic efforts of Philip, Sulpicius, and the Athenians centred on the Aetolian League, which seemed inclined to support the Romans but remained neutral at this stage. In the spring, Sulpicius and the Dardanians separately invaded Upper Macedonia, while the Aetolian League joined the war on the Roman side and invaded Magnesia and Perrhaebia, then continued to ravage Thessaly. There, Philip suddenly appeared and completely defeated their force. He spent some time besieging the Aetolian city of Thaumaci, but gave up and withdrew as winter approached. He spent the winter training his army and engaging in diplomacy, particularly with the Achaean League.

=== Campaigns against Flamininus ===
Publius Villius Tappulus replaced Sulpicius in command, but spent most of the year dealing with a mutiny. In summer 198 BC Philip marched west and encamped on both sides of the Aoös river where it passed through a narrow ravine. Villius marched to meet him, but was still considering what to do when he learnt that his successor, Titus Quinctius Flamininus was on his way to Corcyra to assume command. At a peace conference, Flamininus announced the Romans' new peace terms. Up to this point, the Romans had merely ordered Philip to stop attacking the Greek cities. Now Flamininus demanded that he should make reparations to all the Greek cities he had harmed and withdraw all his garrisons from cities outside Macedonia, including Thessaly, which had been part of the Macedonian kingdom continuously since 353 BC. Philip stormed out of the meeting in anger and Flamininus decided to attack. In the subsequent Battle of the Aous, the Macedonian force collapsed and fled, suffering 2,000 casualties. Philip gathered up the survivors and retreated to Thessaly and then to Tempe.

Over the winter of 198/197 BC, Philip declared his willingness to make peace. The parties met at Nicaea in Locris in November 198 - Philip sailed from Demetrias, but he refused to disembark and meet Flamininus and his allies on the beach, so he addressed them from the prow of his ship. To prolong the proceedings, Flamininus insisted that all his allies should be present at the negotiations. He then reiterated his demands that Philip should withdraw all his garrisons from Greece, Illyria, and Asia Minor. Philip was not prepared to go this far and he was persuaded to send an embassy to the Roman Senate. When this embassy reached Rome, the Senate demanded that Philip surrender the "fetters of Greece," Demetrias, Chalcis, and Corinth, but Philip's envoys claimed they had no permission to agree to this, so the war continued. Over the rest of the winter, Philip mobilised all the manpower of his kingdom, which amounted to 18,000 men. To these he added 4,000 peltasts from Thrace and Illyria, and 2,500 mercenaries. All these forces were gathered at Dion.

In June 197 BC, Flamininus marched north through Thermopylae, with allies from Aetolia, Gortyn, Apollonia, and Athamania. Philip marched south into Thessaly and the two armies met at the Battle of Cynoscephalae (Plb. 18.18-27; Livy 33.5-11). In what proved to be the decisive engagement of the war, the legions of Flamininus defeated Philip's Macedonian phalanx. Philip himself fled on horseback, collected the survivors, and withdrew to Macedonia. Philip was forced to sue for peace on Roman terms.

=== Peace treaty with Rome ===
In 196 BC Philip V signed a peace treaty with the Romans. As per the treaty, Philip V had to relinquish his claim to all Greek cities on the mainland and Asia Minor, including the "fetters" of Greece - Corinth, Chalcis and Demetrias (Plb. 18.44-46). He could also no longer harvest timber on the territory under his control. This effectively meant he could not build up an arsenal of weapons, such as large naval vessels.

Following the peace treaty, Philip cooperated with the Romans and provided material support for their wars against the Spartans under Nabis in 195 BC. Philip V also supported the Romans against Antiochus III the Great and the Aetolian League. After the Roman–Seleucid War the Romans allowed Philip V to keep territory he had conquered, such as Demetrias, the Magnesian coastline of Thessaly, parts of Athamania, parts of Dolopia, parts of Perrhaebia, and a number of towns in the Malian Gulf.

== Internal reforms ==
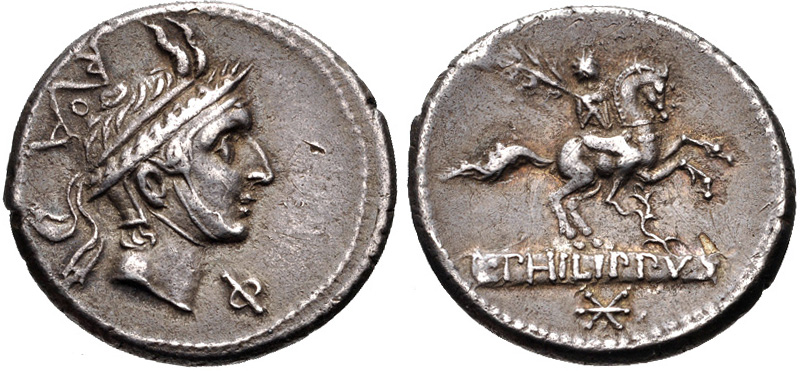
Roman denarius of Lucius Marcius Philippus, minted circa 113 BC, with Philip V on the obverse, wearing the traditional helmet with goat's horns.

Philip V was able to generate revenue by imposing taxes on the population of Macedonia and the exploitation of royal property, including mining, forestry and agriculture. According to the Roman historian Livy, less than half of the tributum paid to Philip V was passed on to Rome after 168 BC. Following the Second Macedonian War, Philip V increased his revenues from agriculture and mines. Philip focused on consolidating power within Macedonia. He reorganised the country's internal affairs and finances. Mines were reopened, and a new currency was minted.

== Final years ==
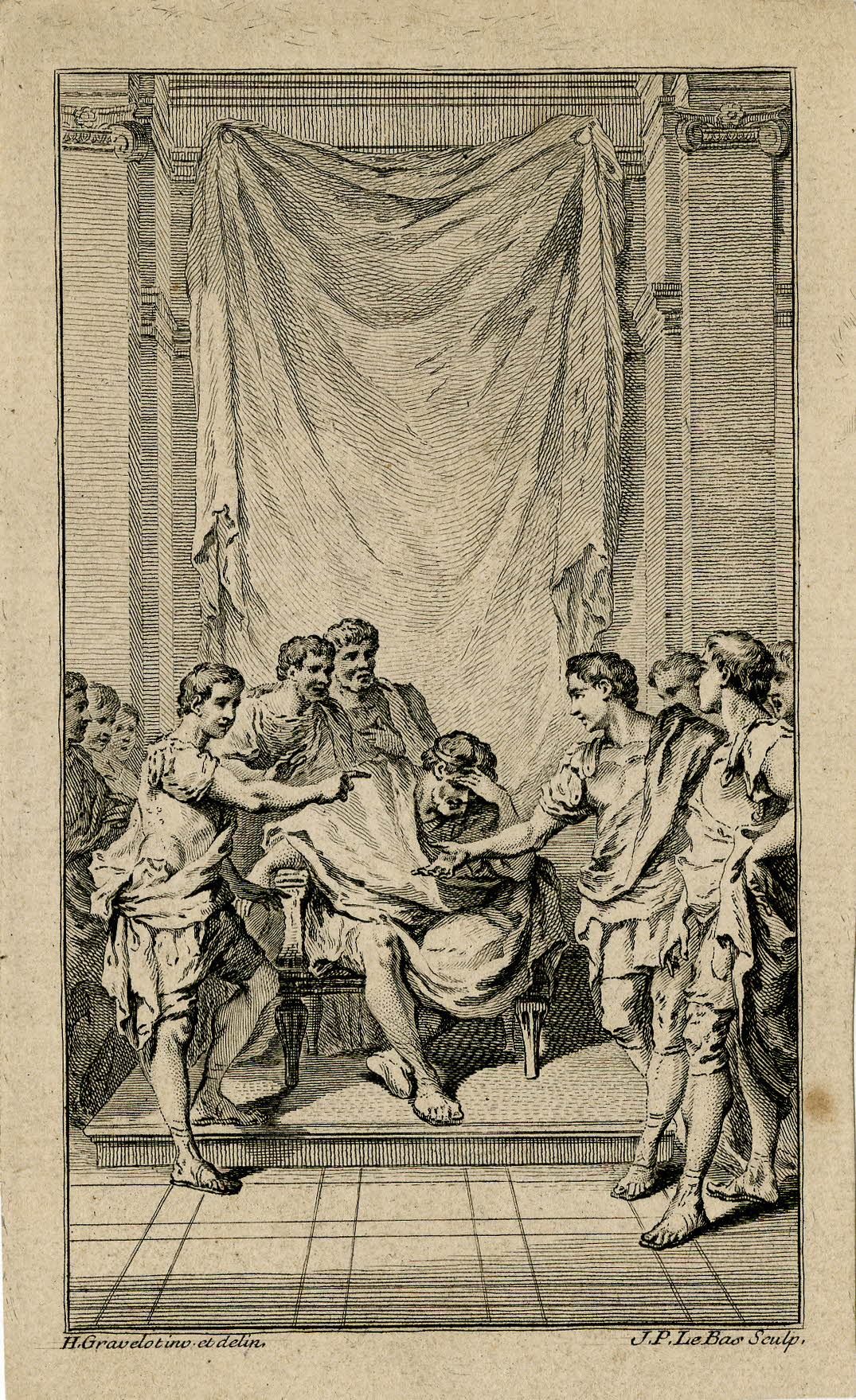
Philip King of Macedon hearing his sons Perseus and Demetrius, illustration from 'The Ancient History of the Egyptians, Carthaginians, Assyrians, Babylonians, Medes, and Persians', ca. 1740.

However, Rome continued to be suspicious of Philip's intentions. Accusations by Macedon's neighboring states, particularly Pergamon, led to constant interference from Rome. Feeling the threat growing that Rome would invade Macedon and remove him as king, he tried to extend his influence in the Balkans by force and diplomacy. However, his efforts were undermined by the pro-Roman policy of his younger son Demetrius, who was encouraged by Rome to consider the possibility of succession ahead of his older brother, Perseus. This eventually led to a quarrel between Perseus and Demetrius which forced Philip to decide reluctantly to execute Demetrius for treason in 180 BC. This decision had a severe impact on Philip's health and he died a year later at Amphipolis towards the end of 179 B.C.

He was succeeded by his eldest son Perseus, who ruled as the last king of Macedon.

== Sources ==
=== Primary sources ===
- Polybius, Histories, Evelyn S. Shuckburgh (translator); London, New York. Macmillan (1889); Reprint Bloomington (1962).

=== Secondary sources ===
- D'Agostini, Monica (2019). The Rise of Philip V. Edizioni dell'Orso.
- Burton, Paul (2017). Rome and the Third Macedonian War. Cambridge University Press.
- Carney, Elizabeth Donnelley (2000). Women and Monarchy in Macedonia. University of Oklahoma Press. ISBN 0-8061-3212-4.
- Erdkamp, Paul (1998). Hunger and the sword: warfare and food supply in Roman Republican wars (264-30 B.C.). Dutch monographs on ancient history and archaeology. Vol. 20. Gieben. ISBN 978-90-50-63608-7.
- Nicholson, Emma (2023). Philip V of Macedon in Polybius' Histories: Politics, History, and Fiction. Oxford University Press. ISBN 978-0-19-286676-9.
- Walbank, Frank (1940). Philip V of Macedon. Cambridge University Press.
- Worthington, Ian (2023). The Last Kings of Macedonia and the Triumph of Rome. Oxford University Press.

Philip V of Macedon Antigonid dynasty Born: 238 BC Died: 179 BC
Preceded by Antigonus III Doson	King of Macedon; 221–179 BC	Succeeded by Perseus
