= Antiochus (son of Seleucus IV) =

King of the Seleucid Empire from 175 to 170 BC

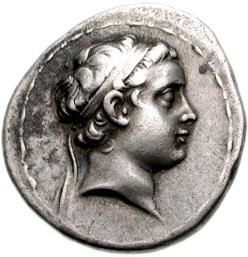
- Silver tetradrachm of Antiochus, son of Seleucus IV, minted in Antioch, featuring a portrait of Antiochus on the obverse. SC 1369

King of Syria
- Reign: 175–170 BC
- Predecessor: Seleucus IV
- Successor: Antiochus IV
- Born: c. 180 BC
- Died: 170 BC; Antioch (modern-day Antakya, Hatay, Turkey)
- Dynasty: Seleucid
- Father: Seleucus IV
- Mother: Laodice IV

Antiochus (Greek: Ἀντίοχος; c. 180 – 170 BC) was a Hellenistic monarch of the Seleucid Empire reigning between 175 and 170 BC.

== Biography ==
Antiochus' year of birth is not specified by ancient historians, but his portrait known from his coins indicate that he was approximately five years old when he assumed the throne in 175 BC. He was the younger son of King Seleucus IV and his wife Laodice IV. The Empire was obligated by the 188 BC Treaty of Apamea, signed after King Antiochus III lost a war against the Romans, to send a hostage to Rome; at first, Antiochus' uncle Antiochus IV was sent as a hostage. After Antiochus III's death in 187 BC, Seleucus IV replaced his brother Antiochus IV with his own eldest son and heir Demetrius I, since Rome considered it important that a son of the reigning king be a hostage. The exchange took place before 178 BC.

The death of Seleucus IV in 175 BC and the presence of Demetrius I in Rome led to the young Antiochus' proclamation as king, but the minister Heliodorus who probably killed Seleucus IV held the real power. Antiochus IV soon arrived in Syria and proclaimed himself a co-ruler, in a succession that was illegal. Antiochus IV disposed of Heliodorus and kept his nephew in the shadow. The young Antiochus died in 170/169 BC (145 SE), possibly on the orders of Antiochus IV. (Note: Some dates in the article are given according to the Seleucid era which is indicated when two years have a slash separating them. Each Seleucid year started in the late autumn of a Gregorian year; thus, a Seleucid year overlaps two Gregorian ones.)

== Notes ==
Antiochus (son of Seleucus IV) Seleucid dynasty Born: c. 180 Died: 170 BC
Preceded by Seleucus IV Philopator	Seleucid King (King of Syria); 175–170 BC	Succeeded by Antiochus IV Epiphanes
