= Demetrius (son of Philip V) =

Demetrius (Greek: Δημήτριος) was the younger son of Philip V of Macedon, but his only son by his legitimate wife, the elder brother Perseus being the son of a concubine.

After the Battle of Cynoscephalae, Philip was obliged to surrender Demetrius, then very young, to Titus Quinctius Flamininus as a hostage, and he was subsequently sent to Rome in that capacity. Five years afterwards he was honourably restored to his father, Philip having at this time obtained the favour of Rome by his services in the war against Antiochus the Great.

But this did not last long, and Philip, finding himself assailed on all sides by the machinations of Rome and her intrigues among his neighbours, determined to try to avert, or at least delay, the impending storm by sending Demetrius, who during his residence at Rome had obtained the highest favour, as his ambassador to the senate.

The young prince was most favourably received, and returned with the answer that the Romans were willing to excuse all the past, out of good-will to Demetrius and from their confidence in his friendly dispositions towards them. But the favour thus shown to Demetrius had the effect (as was doubtless the design of the senate) of exciting against him the jealousy of Philip, and in a still higher degree that of Perseus, who suspected his brother, perhaps not without cause, of intending to supplant him on the throne after his father's death, with the assistance of the Romans.

Perseus therefore endeavoured to effect his ruin by his intrigues, and, having failed in accomplishing this by accusing him falsely of an attempt upon his life, he suborned Didas, one of Philip's generals, to accuse Demetrius of holding treasonable correspondence with the Romans, and of intending to escape to them. A forged letter, pretending to be from Flamininus, appeared to confirm the charge, and Philip was induced to consign him to the custody of Didas, by whom he was secretly put to death, as it was supposed, by his father's order.

Demetrius was 26 years old at the time of his death; he is represented by Livy as a very amiable and accomplished young man, but it may well be doubted whether he was as innocent as he appears in that author's eloquent narrative.
