= Seleucus IV Philopator =

King of the Seleucid Empire from 187 to 175 BC

- Basileus
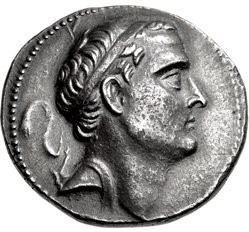
- Silver tetradrachm of Seleucus IV, minted in Ptolemais-Ake, featuring a portrait of Seleucus on the obverse. SC 1331a

Basileus of the Seleucid Empire
- Reign: 3 July 187 – 3 September 175 BC
- Predecessor: Antiochus III the Great
- Successor: Antiochus
- Born: c. 218 BC
- Died: 3 September 175 BC (aged 42–43)
- Spouse: Laodice IV
- Issue: Antiochus; Demetrius I Soter; Laodice V
- Dynasty: Seleucid
- Father: Antiochus III the Great
- Mother: Laodice III

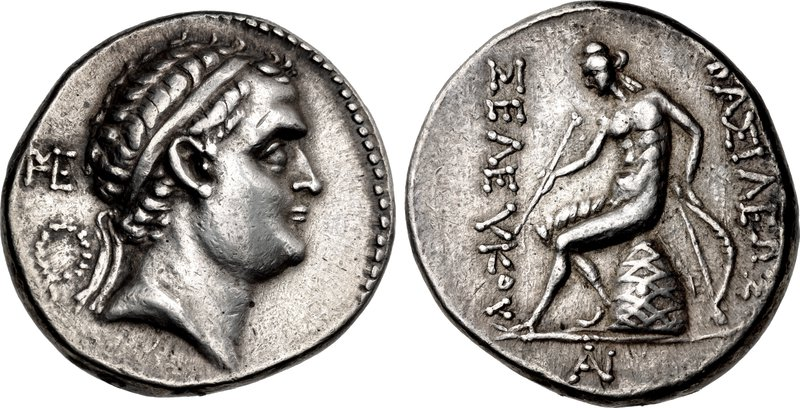
Coin of Seleucus IV Philopator. Reverse shows Apollo seated on omphalos. Greek legend reads: BΑΣΙΛΕΩΣ ΣΕΛΕΥΚΟΥ, "of king Seleucus."

Seleucus IV Philopator (Greek: Σέλευκος Φιλοπάτωρ, Séleukos philopátōr, meaning "Seleucus the father-loving"; c. 218 – 3 September 175 BC), ruler of the Hellenistic Seleucid Empire, reigned from 187 BC to 175 BC over a realm consisting of Syria (now including Cilicia and Judea), Mesopotamia, Babylonia and Nearer Iran (Media and Persia).

== Biography ==
=== Birth and family ===
He was the second son and successor of Antiochus III the Great and Laodice III. He was made heir to his father after the death of his elder brother Antiochus the young king, in 193 BC. Seleucus IV wed his sister Laodice IV, by whom he had three children: two sons Demetrius I Soter, Antiochus and a daughter Laodice V.

=== Seleucid conflict with Rome ===
During the prelude to the Roman-Seleucid War, Seleucus was put in charge of the re-established colony of Lysimacheia by his father. Upon the outbreak of war, Seleucus commanded his own force, unsuccessfully besieging Pergamon, and taking the city of Phocaea before fighting in the Battle of Magnesia alongside his father. After their defeat at Magnesia, Seleucus was made co-regent in 189 BC and the Seleucids signed the Treaty of Apamea with Rome in 188 BC. As part of the treaty, Seleucus oversaw the supply of grain and scouts to Roman and Pergamene forces during their campaign against the Galatians.

=== Reign ===
In 187 BC, Antiochus died after looting the Temple of Bel in Elymaïs and Seleucus took over as Basileus. He renewed an alliance with the Achaean League, and almost joined in Pharnaces I's invasion of Galatia, before reconsidering and turning back. He also substituted his son Demetrius instead of his brother Antiochus IV as a hostage in Rome.

=== Death ===
On September 3, 175 BC (137 SE), Seleucus was assassinated by Heliodorus, one of his leading bureaucrats. The ancient sources do not record a motive for this act; possibly it was simple lust for power, or possibly the sources misattributed the death to the one who gained the most from it. Heliodorus took over as regent, ruling on behalf of Seleucus IV's young child Antiochus. Heliodorus's reign as regent was brief, however; months later, he was replaced by Antiochus IV with support from Pergamon.

== In the Judeo-Christian tradition ==
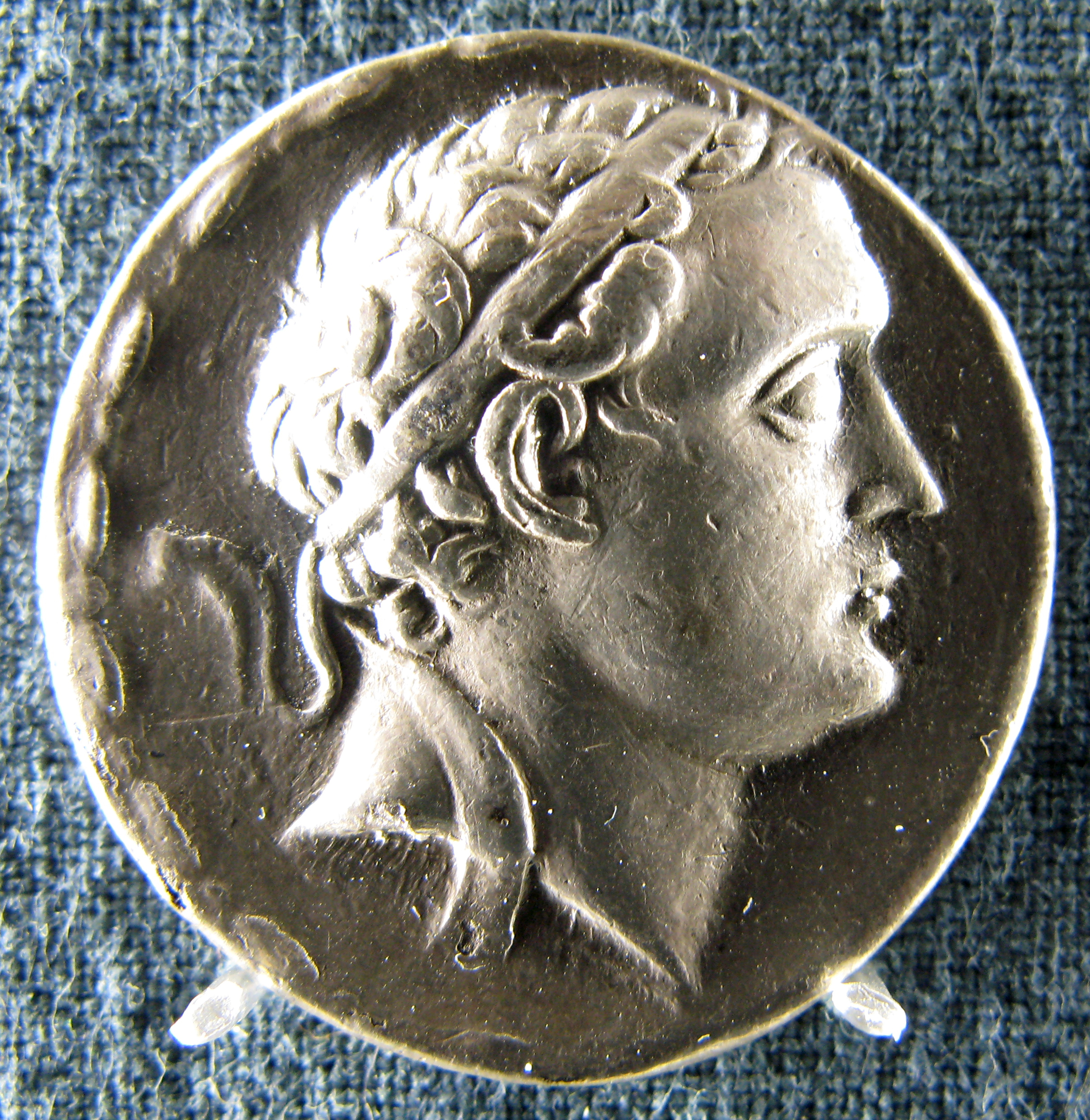
Portrait of Seleucus IV Philopator on the obverse of one of his silver coins.

The book 2 Maccabees discusses Seleucus IV, a Jewish text later included as scripture by Christians. In 2 Maccabees 3, Seleucus IV sends out Heliodorus on a tax-collecting mission after hearing an inflated report of the Temple's wealth. Helidorus attempts to raid the treasury of the Second Temple in Jerusalem, but is repelled by angelic beings in a miracle. The incident is also referred to obliquely in the Book of Daniel which states that Seleucus "will send out a tax collector to maintain the royal splendor"; the collector is also referred to as an "extortioner" (Jerusalem Bible) or an "exactor of tribute" (Revised Standard Version).

== Other ancient accounts ==
In general, many (non-religious) ancient sources portray Seleucus IV as something of a weak ruler. Lester L. Grabbe cautions that this hostility may be unwarranted from historians who expected skilled kings to go to war. Seleucis IV appears to have run a fairly quiet period of rebuilding, but he managed relations with Rome astutely given the inferior position the Seleucid Empire found itself in after its defeat in the Roman–Seleucid War. A decade of peace would give the Seleucid Empire time to recover its strength.

== See also ==
- List of Syrian monarchs
- Timeline of Syrian history

== Bibliography ==
- Grainger, John D. (2015). The Seleukid Empire of Antiochus III (223–187 BC). Barnsley: Pen and Sword.

Seleucus IV Philopator Seleucid dynasty Born: c. 218 Died: 175 BC
Preceded by Antiochus III the Great	Seleucid King (King of Syria); 187–175 BC	Succeeded by Antiochus
