= Alexander (son of Perseus) =

2nd-century BC Macedonian noble

Alexander (Greek: Άλέξανδρος), son of Perseus of Macedon, was a child at the conquest of his father by the Romans, and after the triumph of Aemilus Paullus in 167 BC, was kept in custody at Alba Fucens, together with his father. He became skilful in the toreutic art, learned the Latin language, and became a public notary.
