= Polycratia of Argos =

Polycratia (Greek: Πολυκρατία; fl. 213 BC) was an Argive woman, mother of Perseus of Macedon.

She was married to Aratus the Younger, the son of the great Achaean statesman Aratus of Sicyon. She probably gave him a son, also named Aratus, who later became an ambassador of the Achaean League. When Aratus and his son came to the court of Macedon, Polycratia was seduced by the young king Philip V who later resolved to have her father-in-law and her husband poisoned. Some sources state that she actually married Philip and became the mother of his son Perseus, who succeeded his father in 179 BC.
