= Battle of Abacaenum =

Battle in Sicily in 393 BC

Coordinates: 38°03′N 15°06′E

- Part of the Sicilian Wars
Date	393 BC
Location	Abacaenum
Result	Siceliot victory

Belligerents
Syracuse	Carthage

Commanders and leaders
Dionysius	Mago

Strength
Unknown	Unknown

Casualties and losses
Unknown	800

The Battle of Abacaenum took place between the Carthaginian forces under Mago and the Siceliot army under Dionysius in 393 BC near the Sicilian town on Abacaenum in north-eastern Sicily. Dionysius, tyrant of Syracuse, had been expanding his influence over Sicels' territories in Sicily. After Dionysius' unsuccessful siege in 394 BC of Tauromenium, a Carthaginian ally, Mago decided to attack Messana. However, the Carthaginian army was defeated by the Greeks near the town of Abacaenum and had to retire to the Carthaginian territories in Western Sicily. Dionysius did not attack the Carthaginians but continued to expand his influence in eastern Sicily.

== Background ==
Carthage had intervened in favour of Segesta in 409 BC against Selinus, which led to the sack of both Selinus and Himera in 409 BC. This led to Hermocrates raiding Punic territory, with Carthage retaliating through the destruction of Akragas, Gela and Camarina. In 405 BC, a peace treaty ended the war, with Carthage in control of much of Sicily and Dionysius retaining power in Syracuse. After strengthening Syracuse's defences, Dionysius attacked the Phoenician city of Motya with an army of 80,000 infantry and 3,000 cavalry, along with a fleet of 200 warships and 500 transports carrying his supplies and war machines in 398 BC, igniting the first of four wars he was to lead against Carthage. After the sack of Motya, Dionysius retired to Syracuse, while Himilco of Carthage arrived in Sicily in 397 BC with 50,000 men along with 400 triremes and 600 transports to continue the war.

Himilco stormed Motya, where the mostly Sicel garrison under Biton was easily overcome, then lifted the siege of Segesta, and Dionysius retired to Syracuse instead of offering battle in Western Sicily against a superior army. Himilco returned to Panormus, garrisoned the Carthaginian territories, and then sailed to Lipara with 300 warships and 300 transports. After collecting 30 talents of silver as tribute from Lipara, the Carthaginian force sailed for Messene and easily captured and sacked the city. After founding the city of Tauromenium and populating it with allied Sicels, the Carthaginians moved south towards Catana. Dionysius moved his army and fleet to Catana to attack the Carthaginians but, due to the rash tactics of his brother Leptines, the Greek fleet was heavily defeated at the Catana. Himilco next besieged Syracuse itself in the autumn of 397 BC. After the Carthaginian forces were devastated by the plague, Dionysius managed to decimate the Punic fleet and surround the survivors in their camp. Himilco, after bribing Dionysius, fled back to Africa with Carthaginian citizens, while Dionysius enslaved the abandoned Carthaginian soldiers and their allies.

== Sicily during 396-393 BC ==
The Sicilian Greek cities which had become tributaries to Carthage after 405 BC had all revolted by 398 BC, and along with the Sicels and the Sikans had joined Dionysius in his attack against Motya. But in 396 BC the situation had changed. After the defeat at Catana the Sicilian Greek soldiers had returned to their respective homes when Dionysius decided to withstand a siege in Syracuse instead of fighting a pitched battle against the Carthaginian army in 397 BC. The Sicels had also turned against Dionysius and had sent soldiers to help Himilco during the Carthaginian siege of Syracuse in 397 BC.

=== Carthage: plagued by problems ===
The return of Himilco to Carthage after abandoning his troops at the mercy of Dionysius did not sit well with the Carthaginian citizens or their African subjects. Although the council of 104 did not crucify him, as unsuccessful Carthaginian commanders normally were, Himilco decided to do the deed himself. He publicly took full responsibility for the debacle, dressed in rags visited all the temples of the city pleading for deliverance and finally bricked himself shut inside his house and starved himself to death. A plague swept through Carthage's African territories weakening Carthage further. Then the Libyans, angered by the desertion of their kinsmen in Sicily, gathered an army numbering 70,000 men and besieged Carthage itself.

Mago, the victor of Catana, took command. The standing Punic army was in Sicily and recruiting a new one would have been time-consuming and probably very costly (Himilco's abandonment of his mercenaries in Sicily would have made them wary), so he rallied the Carthaginian citizens to man the walls while the Punic navy kept the city supplied, as the Libyans had no ships to counter the Carthaginian fleet. Mago then used bribes and other means to quell the rebels.

==== Mago in Sicily ====
After securing the safety of Carthage, Mago moved to Sicily, where the threat of a Syracusan invasion of Carthaginian western Sicily was ever-present, with the Punic city of Solus having been sacked by Dionysius in 396 BC. Carthage was unwilling or unable to provide Mago with additional forces, and he had to make do with the Punic garrison left by Himilco and whatever forces he could gather in Sicily. The Carthaginians gained some time when Dionysius chose not to invade the Punic territories in western Sicily immediately after the disaster at Syracuse. Mago chose to use the opportunity wisely. The Elymians had stayed loyal to Carthage, the Sicilian Greeks and Sikans were not threatening and most of the Sicels were not hostile.

Mago chose not to try to recover the lost Punic conquests of 405 BC through force. Instead, he adopted a policy of cooperation and friendship, giving aid to Greeks, Sikans, Sicels and Elymians regardless of their prior standing with Carthage. Many of the Greeks had been victims of the duplicity and aggression of Dionysius (he had destroyed Greek cities Naxos, Leontini and Catana and driven out the population) and even preferred to live under Punic rule.

The Carthaginians had allowed Greeks who had fled from Akragas, Gela and Camarina to resettle and reclaim their properties, and Mago now began to pursue a policy of friendship in earnest. Many of the Greeks from Naxos, Catana and Leontini, left as refugees by Dionysius, along with Sicels, Sikans and other Sicilian Greeks, were allowed to settle in Punic territory, alliances were also made with Sicel tribes being threatened by Dionysius. The Greeks cities, who had thrown off Carthaginian control after the war started in 398 BC, now moved from a pro-Syracuse position to a neutral one, either feeling threatened by Dionysius or because of the activities of Mago. This peaceful policy continued until Dionysius attacked Tauromenium in 394 BC.

== Prelude to war: activities of Dionysius 396-393 BC ==
Dionysius did not immediately attack Punic Sicily after lifting the siege of Syracuse in 396 BC although no formal treaty had been made with Himilco ending the war. The war had been costly and he may have been short of money, he also had to deal with a revolt of his mercenaries, and furthermore, he feared a fight to the finish with Carthage as it might lead to his own demise. After securing Syracuse and resettling the rebellious mercenaries at Leontini (or having them killed after taking them to Leontini on the pretext of handing the town to them), Dionysius began to secure his position in eastern Sicily.

=== Resettlement of Greeks ===
The destruction of Messana by Carthage had left Rhegion, a Greek city hostile to Dionysius, in a position to dominate the straits of Messana, and Carthage with an opportunity to ally with Rhegion and threaten Syracuse from the north. Dionysius rebuilt and repopulated Messina with colonists from Lorci, and Medma from Italy and some from Messene, who were later relocated to Tyndaris when Sparta objected to settling the Messenians in Messana. The original inhabitants of Messana were settled in Tyndaris, another city built by Dionysius. Dionysius forced the Sicel city of Abacaenum to cede its territory to the inhabitants of Tyndaris. The founding of Messana and Tyndaris helped secure the north-eastern coast of Sicily for Dionysius. Rhegion, fearing Dionysius might use Messana as a base of operation against them, established Mylae between Messana and Tyndaris and populated the city with the refugees of Naxos and Catana.

=== Sicel campaigns ===
Abacaenum was not the only Sicel town to be a victim of Dionysius. He attacked and took Smeneous (exact location unknown) and Morgantina, around the same time that the Punic city Solus and the Sicel city Cephaleodium were betrayed to him. The booty captured from these cities filled his coffers. The Sicel town of Enna was sacked next. Dionysius chose not to provoke Agyris, tyrant of Agyrium and second only to Dionysius in Sicily. Alliances were made with the Sicel cities of Agyrium, Herbita, Assorus and Herbessus. In 394 BC, Messanians defeated a Rhegion attack on Messana and took Mylae, and Dionysius besieged Tauromenium in the winter of that year. The Sicels of Tauromenium defeated the night assault Dionysius launched on their city and forced him to lift the siege.

== Opposing forces ==
Himilco had brought 50,000 men along with 400 triremes and 600 transports to Sicily in 397 BC. The majority of the army had been destroyed at Syracuse, and the size of the force Mago commanded in 393 BC is not known but would have been significantly smaller than that available to Himilco.

Dionysius had an army of 30,000 foot and 3,000 horsemen at Catana along with 180 Quinqueremes. He could muster 110 ships at Syracuse, but his forces had shrunk with the desertion of the Sicels and Sicilian Greeks. The exact size of his army at Tauromenium is also unknown.

=== Carthaginian cohorts ===
The Libyans supplied both heavy and light infantry and formed the most disciplined units of the army. The heavy infantry fought in close formation, armed with long spears and round shields, wearing helmets and linen cuirasses. The light Libyan infantry carried javelins and a small shield, same as Iberian light infantry. The Iberian infantry wore purple-bordered white tunics and leather headgear. The heavy infantry fought in a dense phalanx, armed with heavy throwing spears, long body shields and short thrusting swords. Campanian, Sardinian, Sicel and Gallic infantry fought in their native gear, but often were equipped by Carthage. Sicels and other Sicilians were equipped like Greek Hoplites, as were the Sicilian Greek mercenaries. Carthage at this time did not use elephants, but Libyans provided bulk of the heavy, four horse war chariots for Carthage.

The Libyans, Carthaginian citizens and the Libyo-Phoenicians provided disciplined, well-trained cavalry equipped with thrusting spears and round shields. Numidia provided superb light cavalry armed with bundles of javelins and riding without bridle or saddle. Iberians and Gauls also provided cavalry, which relied on the all out charge. Carthage at this time did not use elephants, and there is no mention of war chariots being present in Mago's army. Carthaginian officer corps held overall command of the army, although many units may have fought under their chieftains.

=== Greek forces ===
The mainstay of the Greek army was the Hoplite, drawn mainly from the citizens by Dionysius had a large number of mercenaries from Italy and Greece as well. Sicels and other native Sicilians also served in the army as hoplites and also supplied peltasts, and a number of Campanians, probably equipped like Samnite or Etruscan warriors, were present as well. The Phalanx was the standard fighting formation of the army. The cavalry was recruited from wealthier citizens and hired mercenaries.

== Carthaginian campaign of 393 BC ==
It normally took Carthage some time to organize armies so Mago did not await reinforcements from Africa to arrive. He gathered together whatever forces he could in Sicily and set out for Messana, which had driven out the partisans of Dionysius after his debacle at Tauronemium. The same had happened at Akragas, so the threat from that quarter was less than what it had been in 396 BC. It is not known what the Carthaginian navy did during the campaign or what path Mago took to get to Messana, but the Carthaginian army probably marched along the sea coast as the Sicel lands in central Sicily were either allied to Dionysius or under Syracusan occupation.

=== Battle ===
The Carthaginian army reached the territory of Abacaenum safely on their way back from Messana and encamped near the city, as the Sicels of the city were Carthaginian allies. It is not known where the Greek army was stationed at the time, but Dionysius managed to intercept Mago before the Carthaginians left the area and a battle took place near Abacaenum. Details of the battle are not known, except that the Carthaginians were heavily defeated, losing 800 soldiers and the survivors were forced to take refuge in Abacaenum. Dionysius did not bother besieging the city but retired, which allowed Mago to fall back to Western Sicily.

== Aftermath ==
The defeat did not weaken the Carthaginians in Sicily, nor did Dionysius bother to attack their allies immediately after the battle. The lull gave Carthage time to gather an army and reinforce Mago, and Mago time to further incite the Sicels. The Carthaginians chose to attack central Sicily, probably the Sicels allied with Dionysius, which led to the Battle of Chrysas in 392 BC and a peace treaty between Dionysius and Carthage, which would last until 383 BC when Dionysius again attacked Carthaginian possessions in Sicily.

== Sources ==
- Church, Alfred J. (1886). Carthage (4th ed.). T. Fisher Unwin.
- Freeman, Edward A. (1892). Sicily: Phoenician, Greek & Roman, Third Edition. T. Fisher Unwin.
- Freeman, Edward A. (1894). History of Sicily. Vol. IV. Oxford University Press.
- Kern, Paul B. (1999). Ancient Siege Warfare. Indiana University Publishers. ISBN 0-253-33546-9.
- Warry, John (1993) [1980]. Warfare in The Classical World: An Illustrated Encyclopedia of Weapons, Warriors and Warfare in the Ancient Civilisations of Greece and Rome. New York: Barnes & Noble. ISBN 1-56619-463-6.
