= Battle of Chrysas =

4th-century BC battle in Sicily

- Part of The Sicilian Wars
Date	392 BC
Location	Near the river Chrysas, Sicily
Result	Inconclusive

Belligerents
Syracuse; Agyrium	Carthage

Commanders and leaders
Dionysius, Agyris	Mago II

Strength
20,000 Greeks, 20,000 Sicels	80,000 troops

Casualties and losses
Unknown	Unknown

The Battle of Chrysas was fought in 392 BC in the course of the Sicilian Wars, between the Carthaginian army under the shofet Mago II and a Greek army under Dionysius I, tyrant of Syracuse, who was aided by Agyris, tyrant of the Sicel city of Agyrium. Mago had been defeated by Dionysius at Abacaenum in 393, which had not damaged the Carthaginian position in Sicily. Reinforced by Carthage in 392, Mago moved to attack the Sicles allied with Syracuse in central Sicily. After the Carthaginians reached and encamped near the river Chrysas, the Sicels harassed the Carthaginian supply lines causing a supply shortage, while the Greek soldiers rebelled and deserted Dionysius when he refused to fight a pitched battle. Both Mago and Dionysius agreed to a peace treaty, which allowed the Carthaginians to formally occupy the area west of the River Halycus, while Dionysius was given lordship over the Sicel lands. The peace would last until 383, when Dionysius attacked the Carthaginians again.

== Background ==
Dionysius attacked the Phoenician city of Motya in 398 BC, igniting the first of four wars he was to lead against Carthage between 398 and 368. After the sack of Motya, Dionysius retired to Syracuse, while Himilco II of Carthage arrived in Sicily with 50,000 men along with 400 triremes and 600 transports to continue the war. in 397.

Himilco first stormed Motya, where the mostly Sicel garrison under Biton was easily overcome, then lifted the siege of Segesta, and Dionysius retired to Syracuse instead of offering battle in Western Sicily against a superior army. Himilco returned to Panormus, garrisoned the Carthaginian territories, and then sailed to Lipara and collected 30 talents of silver as tribute. The Carthaginian force next sailed for Messana and easily captured and sacked the city. Himilco founded the city of Tauromenium and populated it with allied Sicels, then moved south towards Catana. Dionysius moved his forces to Catana also but, due to the rash tactics of his brother Leptines, the Greek fleet was heavily defeated at the naval battle of Catana. Himilco next besieged Syracuse itself in the autumn of 397. After the Carthaginian forces were devastated by a plague, Dionysius managed to decimate the Punic fleet and shut up the army survivors in their camp. Himilco, after bribing Dionysius, fled to Africa with Carthaginian citizens, while Dionysius enslaved the abandoned Carthaginian soldiers.

== Sicily during 396-392 BC ==
The Sicilian Greek cities which had become tributary to Carthage after 405 had all revolted in 398, and along with the Sicels and the Sikans had joined Dionysius in his attack against Motya. After the defeat at Catana the Sicilian Greek soldiers had returned to their respective homes when Dionysius decided to withstand a siege in Syracuse against their wishes. The Sicels had also turned against Dionysius and had sent soldiers to help Himilco during the Carthaginian siege of Syracuse in 397 BC.

=== Carthaginian problems ===
The return of Himilco after abandoning his troops to the mercy of Dionysius did not sit well with either the Carthaginian citizenry or their African subjects. Himilco publicly took full responsibility for the debacle, dressed in rags visited all the temples of the city pleading for deliverance, and finally committed suicide. The divine was not mollified as a plague swept through Africa weakening Carthage further, and to top things off, the Libyans, angered by the desertion of their kinsmen in Sicily, gathered an army numbering 70,000 men and besieged Carthage itself.

Mago II, the victor of Catana and scion of the Magonids, took command. The standing Punic army was in Sicily and recruiting a new one would have been time-consuming and probably very costly (Himilco's abandonment would have made mercenaries wary), so he rallied Carthaginian citizens to man the walls while the Punic navy kept the city supplied, as the Libyans had no ships to counter the Carthaginian fleet. Mago then used bribes and other means to quell the rebels.

==== Mago in Sicily ====
After securing the safety of Carthage, Mago moved to Sicily, where the Punic city of Solus had been sacked by Dionysius sometime in 396 BC. Carthage was unwilling or unable to provide Mago with additional forces, and he had to make do with the Punic garrison left by Himilco and whatever forces he could gather in Sicily. The Carthaginians caught a break when Dionysius chose not to invade the Punic territories in Western Sicily immediately lifting the siege of Syracuse. The Elymians had stayed loyal to Carthage since the start of the war, while the Sicilian Greeks and Sikans were not threatening and most of the Sicels were not hostile when Mago arrived in Sicily.

Instead of trying to recover the lost Punic conquests through force, Mago adopted a policy of cooperation and friendship, giving aid to Greeks, Sikans, Sicels, Elymians and Punics regardless of their prior standing with Carthage. Many of the Greeks had been victims of the duplicity and aggression of Dionysius (he had destroyed Greek cities Naxos, Leontini and Catana and driven out the population) and even preferred to live under Punic rule.

The Carthaginians allowed Greeks from Naxos, Catana and Leontini, made refugees by Dionysius, along with Sicels and Sikans to settle in Punic territory, while alliances were made with Sicel tribes being threatened by Dionysius. The Greeks cities, free of Carthaginian overlordship since 398, now moved from a pro-Syracuse position to a neutral one, either feeling threatened by Dionysius or because of the activities of Mago. Mago was forced to take up arms after Dionysius attacked Tauromenium in 394, a Carthaginian alley.

=== Syracuse: Dionysius secures position ===
Dionysius did not immediately attack Punic Sicily after lifting the siege of Syracuse in 396, although no formal treaty had been made ending the war with Carthage. The war had been costly and he may have been short of money, he also had to deal with a revolt of his mercenaries, and furthermore, he feared a fight to the finish with Carthage as it might end up finishing him. After securing Syracuse and resettling the rebellious mercenaries at Leontini (or having them killed after taking them to Leontini in the pretext of handing the town to them), Dionysius began to secure his position in Eastern Sicily.

==== Resettlement of Greeks in north Sicily ====
The destruction of Messana had left Rhegion, a Greek city hostile to Dionysius, in a position to dominate the Strait of Messina, and Carthage with an opportunity to join hands with Rhegion and threaten Syracuse from the north. Dionysius first rebuilt and repopulated Messina with colonists from Locri and Medma from Italy and some from Messene, who were later relocated to Tyndaris when Sparta objected to settling the Messenians in Messana. The original inhabitants of Messana, homeless since the sack of their city in 397, were settled at Tyndaris, another city built by Dionysius after he forced the Sicel city of Abacaenum to cede lands to the new colony. The founding of Messana and Tyndaris helped secure the northeastern coast of Sicily for Dionysius. Rhegion, fearing Dionysius might use Messana as a base against them planted Mylae between Messana and Tyndaris and populated the city with the refugees of Naxos and Catana, however, in 394 BC the Messanians defeated a Rhegion attack on Messana and took Mylae.

== Sicel campaigns ==
After settling Messana Dionysius attacked the Sicels and took Smeneous (exact location unknown) and Morgantina, around which the Punic city Solus and Sicel city Cephaloedium was betrayed to him, the Sicel town of Enna was sacked and the booty fattened his coffers. Syracusan territory by now had expanded to border Agyrium.

=== Sicel allies ===
Agyris, tyrant of Agyrium was a ruthless man, having become rich after killing the leading citizens of Agyrium, commanded 20,000 citizens and many fortresses and was second only to Dionysius in Sicily. Furthermore, Agyris had aided the Campanian mercenaries sent by Carthage to rescued Dionysius in 403 (when the Greek rebels had him besieged in Syracuse and he was close to capitulating), so Dionysius had a personal debt to consider. Dionysius chose not to provoke Agyris or Damon, ruler of Centuripae but made alliances with the Sicel cities of Agyrium, Centuripae, Herbita, Assorus (this city had stayed loyal to Syracuse after other Sicels had deserted to Himilco when Tauromenium was founded in 397 BC) and Herbessus. creating a buffer zone for Syracuse in central Sicily. Dionysius next besieged Tauromenium in the winter, but was forced lift the siege after his night assault failed. Dionysius next attacked Rehgion, but his attack failed, and he returned to Sicily after concluding a treaty with Rhegion to prevent their joining Carthage.

=== Mago moves in 393 ===
It normally took Carthage some time to organize armies so Mago did not await reinforcements from Africa to arrive. He gathered together whatever forces he could in Sicily and set out for Messana, which had deposed out the partisans of Dionysius after his debacle at Tauronemium. Dionysius managed to intercept Mago near Abacaenum and the Carthaginians were heavily defeated, losing 800 soldiers. The defeat did not weaken the Carthagnian position in Sicily. Carthage reinforced Mago, and the stage was set for another confrontation.

== Opposing forces ==
Himilco had brought 50,000 men along with 400 triremes and 600 transports to Sicily in 397. The majority of this army had been destroyed at Syracuse, and the size of the force Mago commanded at Abacaenum is not known except that it had shrunk by a further 8,000 men after the battle. Carthage sent an army of 80,000 soldiers to Sicily, recruited from AfricSardinia and Campania. No Iberian recruits are mentioned, perhaps the presence of Iberians at Leontini and in the army of Syracuse had made Carthage wary of hiring them. Carthaginian troop numbers may have been exaggerated by a factor of two, but it is likely Mago's force outnumbered the Greeks.

Dionysius had mustered an army of 40,000 foot and 3,000 horsemen, from both citizens and mercenaries (at least 10,000, if not more) for attacking Motya in 398, perhaps along with 40,000 Greek, Sicel and Sikan volunteers. At Catana in 397 Dionysius commanded 30,000 foot and 3,000 horse, perhaps he was short of cash to hire mercenaries and part of his forces were manning Syracuse. In 392 Dionysius organized an army of 20,000 men, perhaps garrison duty and cash shortage prevented assembling of a larger contingent. The Sicels mustered an army of 20,000 troops to support Syracuse.

=== Carthaginian cohorts ===
The Libyans supplied both heavy and light infantry and formed the most disciplined units of the army. The heavy infantry fought in close formation, armed with long spears and round shields, wearing helmets and linen cuirasses. The light Libyan infantry carried javelins and a small shield, same as Iberian light infantry. Campanian, Sardinian, Sicel and Gallic infantry fought in their native gear, but often were equipped by Carthage. Sicels and other Sicilians were equipped like Greek Hoplites, as were the Sicilian Greek mercenaries. Mago's force had no Iberian soldiers.

The Libyans, Carthaginian citizens, and the Libyo-Phoenicians provided disciplined, well-trained cavalry equipped with thrusting spears and round shields. Numidia provided superb light cavalry armed with bundles of javelins and riding without bridle or saddle. Iberians and Gauls also provided cavalry, which relied on the all-out charge. Carthage at this time did not use elephants, and there is no mention of war chariots being present in Mago's army. The Carthaginian officer corps held overall command of the army, although many units may have fought under their chieftains.

=== Greek forces ===
The mainstay of the Greek army was the hoplite, drawn mainly from the citizens by Dionysius had a large number of mercenaries from Italy and Greece as well. Sicels and other native Sicilians also served in the army as hoplites and also supplied peltasts, and a number of Campanians, probably equipped like Samnite or Etruscan warriors, were present as well. The Phalanx was the standard fighting formation of the army. The cavalry was recruited from wealthier citizens and hired mercenaries. Dionysius also had the services of a number of Iberian troops, former members of Himilco's army. The Iberian infantry wore purple-bordered white tunics and leather headgear. The heavy infantry fought in a dense phalanx, armed with heavy throwing spears, long body shields, and short thrusting swords.

== Campaign of 392 ==
Carthage had launched 3 major campaigns in Sicily in 409, 406 and 397 and the Punic navy had played a major role in combat, transport, and logistical roles, as all 3 campaigns had progressed along the coast of Sicily. There is no mention of Carthage mobilizing a naval contingent to serve in Sicily in 392, so Mago probably chose an inland route to take on Syracuse. The Carthaginians probably intended to deal with the Sicels allied with Dionysius and not launch a direct attack on Syracuse. The exact route of Mago's march is not known, except that many Sicel cities formally under Dionysius broke away and declared for Carthage. Mago faced little problems until he reached the territory of Agyris near the River Chrysas.

== Stalemate ==
The Carthaginian army was probably dependent on supplies from their strongholds and allies, being inland the Punic fleet could not have supplied them. Mago marched in the territory of Agyris, but failed to persuade him to switch sides. The Carthaginians then moved to intercept the Greek army, but Dionysius, heavily outnumbered, fell back and lured the Carthaginians away from Agryium.

=== "Fabian strategy" ===
Hamilcar Barca during the first Punic war and Quintus Fabius Maximus during the second had adopted a strategy on encamping near their enemy and constantly skirmishing without engaging in pitched battle. Successive Carthaginian commanders faced similar tactics from the Greeks during their campaign in 406, when the Greeks harassed the Punic supply lines and brought them close to disaster. Dionysius now adopted the same strategy. He encamped with his army but refused battle, while the Carthaginians camped nearby, the Sicels were employed to do the harassment.

==== Agyris lends aid ====
Dionysius visited Agyris and secured his cooperation after promising him extensive territories and to supply whatever he needed in future. Agyris sent supplies of corn and other essentials to the Greek camp, then joined Dionysius with his whole army. The Carthaginian army outnumbered the combined armies of Syracuse and Agryium, so the Greeks sat tight while the Sicels began to harass the Punic supply train and foragers. Constant ambushes and skirmishing followed, and the Sicels, operating in their home ground, got the better of things and soon the Carthaginians faced a supply shortage. However, Fabian strategy is time-consuming and that in itself can create fatal drawbacks, as Fabius and Hamilcar would discover in the future and Dionysius discovered at Chrysas.

==== Dionysius deserted ====
Greek commanders had put the Carthaginians in similar situations at Akragas and Gela only to have their schemes scuttled by other factors. Like the plague that derailed Carthaginians campaigns in Sicily, Dionysius often was beset by mutiny and desertion. Sicilian Greeks left his army after his retreat from Gela in 405 BC and from Catana in 397. Syracusan soldiers had mutinied in 405 and 403 BC and almost toppled him, his mercenaries mutinied after his victory at Syracuse in 396 BC. While mercenaries fought as long as they got paid, Greek citizen-soldiers liked short campaigns. When Dionysius refused to heed their call for battle and decided to persist with the guerrilla tactics, the Syracusans simply left his camp and went home.

== Mutual discomfort and peace ==
Dionysius made up his depleted numbers by freeing the slaves of the departed Greeks and arming them, but his army had shrunk both in numbers and fighting quality. It is not known if Mago got wind of his predicament or why he took no action. Dionysius had to cope with the possibility of a Carthaginian attack and also possible betrayal by the Sicels, victims of many a Greek scheme in the past. Mago had three options: sue for peace, retreat or fight a pitched battle. With both parties seeking a way out of their predicaments without battle, peace negotiations were opened and concluded.

=== Reworking the 405 treaty ===
Himilco and Dionysius had concluded a peace treaty in 405 after the Carthaginians had sacked Akragas, Gela and Camarina, with only the plague stopping them from attacking Syracuse. The terms of that treaty were:

- Carthage kept full control of the Phoenician cities in Sicily. Elymian and Sikan cities were put in Carthaginian sphere of influence.
- Greeks were allowed to return to Selinus, Akragas, Camarina and Gela. These cities, including the new city of Thermae, paid tribute to Cartage. Gela and Camarina were forbidden to repair their walls.
- The Sicels and Messene were to remain free of Carthaginian and Syracusan influence, as was Leontini.
- Dionysius was confirmed as ruler of Syracuse.
- Both sides agreed to release prisoners and ships captured during the campaign.

The Sicilian political situation in 392 had changed considerably. Carthage was in control of Phoenicians, Sikans, and Elymians, but the tributary Greeks cities had become independent of Carthaginian control. Dionysius had occupied Leontini while Messene was allied with Syracuse. The Sicels were divided, some were under Greek occupation or allied with Dionysius, while others, especially Tauromenium, was allied with Carthage. Dionysius and Mago agreed to terms, which are not clearly known but which reflected the ground reality:

- The Sicels became subjects of Dionysius. Which meant Dionysius was free to attack Tauromenium without Carthaginian interference.
- The Carthaginian dominion reached the rivers Halycas and Himera, the Greek cities of Selinus, Thermae and part of the Akragan territory (Heraclea Minoa) was now Carthaginian. Over a third of Sicily was under the direct control of Carthage. Carthage further retained control over the Phoenicians, Elymians, and Sikans. If anything was agreed regarding the status of Akragas, Gela, Camarina, the former vassals of Carthage, it is not known, but Carthage did not try to recover their former vassals.

==== Reasons for peace ====
Although both Mago and Dionysius were in a jam at Chrysas, it was probably possible for them to disengage and continue the war. However, the following factors may have influenced their agreeing to the peace pact:

- Unlike the Roman Republic, which always fought to achieve a favorable outcome, with treaties seen as temporary interludes, the Carthaginians were mostly willing to negotiate and abide by treaties as long as their commercial infrastructure was intact. Carthage kept to the terms of the treaty after the Battle of Himera in 480 for 70 years. In 149, Carthage continually submitted to the ever harsher demands of the Roman consuls until they demanded Carthaginians to move to an inland location, ending their commercial activities. Only then did the Carthaginians decided to go down in flames.
- Dionysius kept all his conquests since 396 and further gained recognition of his dominion over the Sicels. He had little reason to continue the war.
- The armies of Dionysius had shrunk in size because of cash shortage and he had been forced to pay off his mercenaries with land. Carthage had deeper pockets and fighting them may not have been cost-effective in the long run.
- Dionysius was not fighting a crusade to save Greek civilization from barbarians, peace with Carthage meant he could take on softer targets, especially Italian Greeks.

== Aftermath ==
Mago II sailed back to Carthage after the treaty and the Carthaginian army was disbanded. Carthage launched no wars in the Mediterranean. Dionysius took bloodless possession of Tauromenium in 391 and replaced the Sicel population with his mercenaries. If Dionysius compensated Agyris for his crucial services, the details are not known. The Syracusan rebels joined Dionysius before the treaty was signed and he promptly returned the freed slaves to their masters. After settling his affairs in Sicily, Dionysius began a campaign against Rhegion in 390. He failed to take the city in 390 and 389 and finally succeeded in 387. Three years later, he again started a war with Carthage, killing Mago II at Cabala but losing to his son Mago III at Cronium in 375.
