= Siege of Lilybaeum =

Siege of Lilybaeum may refer to:

- Siege of Lilybaeum (250–241 BC)
- Siege of Lilybaeum (278 BC)
- Siege of Lilybaeum (368 BC)
