= Siege of Syracuse (397 BC) =

Unsuccessful siege by Carthage during Sicilian Wars

Coordinates: 37°04′09″N 15°17′15″E

- Part of The Sicilian Wars
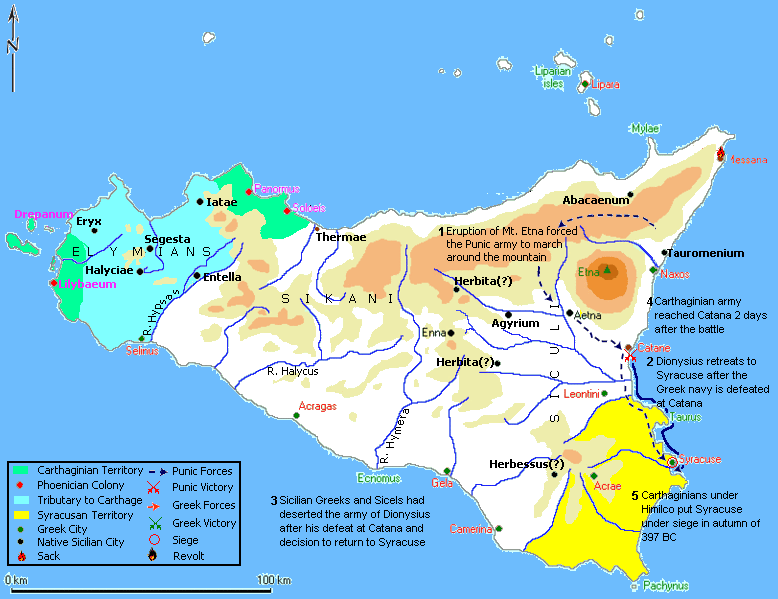
- Punic siege of Syracuse 397 BC. Political boundaries and path of troop movement are inexact because of lack of primary source data.
Date	Summer of 397 BC to summer of 396 BC
Location	Syracuse, Sicily, Italy
Result	Greek victory

Belligerents
Syracuse; Sicilian Greeks	Carthage

Commanders and leaders
Dionysius; Leptines	Himilco; Mago

Strength
30,000 troops 80 quinqueremes 30 triremes	50,000 troops 40 quinqueremes 200 triremes 2,000 transports

Casualties and losses
Unknown, less than the Carthaginians	Unknown, plague killed majority of troops

The siege of Syracuse in 397 BC was the first of four unsuccessful sieges Carthaginian forces would undertake against Syracuse from 397 to 278 BC. In retaliation for the siege of Motya by Dionysius of Syracuse, Himilco of the Magonid family of Carthage led a substantial force to Sicily. After retaking Motya and founding Lilybaeum, Himilco sacked Messana, then laid siege to Syracuse in the autumn of 397 BC after the Greek navy was crushed at Catana.

The Carthaginians followed a strategy which the Athenians had used in 415 BC and were successful in isolating Syracuse. A pestilence broke out in the Carthaginian camp in the summer of 396 BC, which killed the majority of the troops. Dionysius launched a combined land and sea attack on the Carthaginian forces, and Himilco escaped with the Carthaginian citizens after an underhanded deal with Dionysius. The surviving Libyans were enslaved, the Sicels melted away while the Iberians joined Dionysius. Dionysius began expanding his domain, while Carthage, weakened by the plague, took no action against Syracusan activities until 393 BC.

== Background ==
Carthage had previously invaded Sicily in 406 BC, in retaliation of Greek raids on Phoenician lands. This expedition was first commanded by Hannibal Mago who, after the siege of Akragas by his kinsman Himilco, had managed to capture and sack the cities of Akragas, Gela and Camarina by the summer of 405 BC. These defeats had caused political turmoil in Syracuse, and had ultimately brought Dionysius to power as tyrant. Himilco and Dionysius signed a peace treaty in 405 BC, which left Carthage in direct or indirect control of 60% of Sicily. The cities of Messina and Leontini were left independent, and Dionysius was acknowledged as the ruler of Syracuse by Carthage.

=== Dionysius gets ready ===
Between 405 BC and 398 BC, Dionysius set about securing his political position and increasing the armed forces of Syracuse. He broke the treaty with Himilco in 404 BC by starting a war with the Sicels. While Carthage did nothing in response, Dionysius was put in a difficult situation by a revolt within his army, which besieged him in Syracuse. Fortune and incompetence of his enemies helped Dionysius to emerge triumphant from this crisis. Dionysius then enlarged his territory by conquering and sacking the cities of Naxos and Catana, and annexing Leontini. He hired mercenaries and enlarged his fleet, building 200 new ships. Syracuse was fortified, with Dionysius turning the island of Ortygia (where the original city of Syracuse stood) into a fortress and encompassing the Epipolae Plateau by massive walls. He hired workmen to create new weapons (such as the Catapult), and new ships (such as the Quinquereme). In 398 BC, Dionysius attacked the Phoenician city of Motya with an army of 80,000 infantry and 3,000 cavalry, along with a fleet of 200 warships and 500 transports carrying his supplies and war machines. This ignited the first of four wars he was to lead against Carthage.

=== The war begins ===
The attack of Dionysius caused the Sicilian Greeks and Sikans under Carthaginian dominion to rebel, and by the time Dionysius besieged Motya, only 5 cities remained in league (Segesta, Entella, Palermo and Solus among them) with Carthage in Sicily. Lacking a standing army, Carthage could only send a fleet of 100 triremes under Himilco to aid Motya. Himilco was unsuccessful and Dionysius sacked Motya after overcoming fierce Punic resistance.

After Carthage had readied its forces, Himilco sailed from Africa and landed at Palermo, and then captured Eryx. Himilco next stormed Motya, where the mostly Sicel garrison under Biton was easily overcome. The Carthaginians then lifted the siege of Segesta, and Dionysius retired to Syracuse instead of offering battle in Western Sicily against a superior army. Himilco returned to Palermo, garrisoned the Carthaginian territories, and then sailed to Lipara with 300 warships and 300 transports. After collecting 30 talents of silver as tribute from Lipara, the Carthaginian force landed at Cape Pelorum, and the army of Messene marched north from the city to confront the Carthaginians. Himilco sent 200 ships filled with picked soldiers and rowers to Messene, and easily captured and sacked the city. The Greeks scattered to the fortresses in the countryside, and Himilco unsuccessfully tried to capture the forts.

Himilco chose not to set up base at Messina, but marched south, and founded a city in Tauromenion, which he populated with Sicels. The Sicels now deserted Dionysius, so two things was achieved with one stroke, Himilco managed to detached allies away from Dionysius and at the same time gaining allies to block any activity by the still hostile Greeks of Messina in his rear. The Carthaginians resumed marching south along the coast, with the fleet sailing alongside. However, a severe eruption of Mt. Etna made the path north of Naxos impassable, so Himilco marched to detour around Mt. Etna. Mago with the fleet sailed to Catana, where he was to meet up with Carthaginian army.

Dionysius had freed all the slaves in Syracuse to man 60 additional ships, provisioned the fortresses at Syracuse and Leontini with soldiers and supplies, and hired 1000 mercenaries from Greece. He moved his army and fleet to Catana to attack the Carthaginians. Due to the rash tactics of his brother Leptines, the Greek fleet was heavily defeated at the Battle of Catana (397 BC), over 20,000 soldiers/rowers and 100 ships were lost before the surviving Greek ships could retreat.

== Opposing forces ==
Himilco led the Carthaginian army (50,000 men, 400 triremes, and 600 transports) to Sicily in 397 BC. When the Carthaginians reached Syracuse, their war fleet had shrunk to 208 ships, though 2,000 transports had been employed to carry supplies to the army. The number of soldiers in Syracuse is unknown, as some garrisoned the Carthaginian possessions, and the Carthaginians had been reinforced by Sicels, Sikans and Elymians after arriving in Sicily.

Dionysius had an army of 30,000 foot and 3,000 horsemen at Catana along with 180 quinqueremes. After the defeat of his navy and the desertion of his allies Dionysius' forces had shrunk to 80 ships. He managed to hire some mercenaries to make up for these losses, and the population of Syracuse supplied a number of soldiers to augment his forces. 30 triremes later joined him from Greece.

=== Carthaginian cohorts ===
The Libyans supplied both heavy and light infantry and formed the most disciplined units of the army. The heavy infantry fought in close formation, armed with long spears and round shields, wearing helmets and linen cuirasses. The light Libyan infantry carried javelins and a small shield, same as Iberian light infantry. Campanian, Sardinian and Gallic infantry fought in their native gear, but often were equipped by Carthage. Sicels and other Sicilians were equipped like Greek Hoplites.

The Libyans, Carthaginian citizens and the Libyo-Phoenicians provided disciplined, well trained cavalry equipped with thrusting spears and round shields. Numidia provided superb light cavalry armed with bundles of javelins and riding without bridle or saddle. Iberians and Gauls also provided cavalry, which relied on the all out charge. The Libyans also provided bulk of the heavy, four horse war chariots for Carthage, but Carthage at this point of time did not make use of war elephants. Himilco had lost his chariots when 50 of his transports were sunk by the Greeks off Eryx and none seemed to have served at Syracuse. Carthaginian officer corps held overall command of the army, although many units may have fought under their chieftains.

The Punic navy was built around the trireme, Carthaginian citizens usually served as crew alongside recruits from Libya and other Carthaginian domains. Carthaginian forces had captured a number of Quinqueremes from the Greeks at Catana, it is unknown if Carthaginians were constructing this type of ships themselves at this point. 40 Quinqueremes were present at Syracuse. Although the initial Punic armada at Syracuse contained 208 warships and 3,000 transports, it is unknown how many were permanently stationed there for the siege.

=== Greek forces ===
The mainstay of the Greek army was the Hoplite, drawn mainly from the citizens by Dionysius, had a large number of mercenaries from Italy and Greece as well. Sicels and other native Sicilians also served in the army as hoplites and also supplied peltasts, and a number of Campanians, probably equipped like Samnite or Etruscan warriors, were present as well. The Phalanx formation was the standard fighting formation of the army. Dionysius also had the option of using old men and women as peltasts if needed. The cavalry was recruited from wealthier citizens and mercenaries.

The Syracuse navy was built around the Quinquereme, an invention attributed to Dionysius, and the trireme. Dionysius also transport ships available, but the number is unknown. Citizen rowers manned the fleet.

== Prelude to the siege ==
The defeat at Catana put Dionysius in a difficult position. With the Greek fleet beaten, Mago had gained the option of making a dash at Syracuse itself, repeating the feat the Carthaginians had pulled at Messene on Syracuse. On the other hand, if Dionysius could now attack and defeat the army of Himilco, Mago would be compelled to fall back to a secure base. However, Dionysius also had to keep in mind the possibility of political trouble in Syracuse in deciding his strategy. The Greek army was opposed to facing a siege, and at first Dionysius was inclined to seek the Carthaginian army out and measure swords with Himilco. When his advisers pointed out the threat of Mago and his fleet capturing Syracuse in the absence of the Greek army, Dionysius decided to break camp, leave Catana and march south to Syracuse. At this juncture, Mother Nature intervened for the embattled Greeks, as worsening weather forced Mago to beach his ships, thus making the Punic fleet vulnerable to the Greek army attacks. However, luck seems to have favoured the Carthaginians, because Dionysius commenced his retreat prior to this, with the remnant of his fleet sailing parallel along the coast. This decision to face a siege proved so unpopular among the Sicilian Greek allies that they deserted the army and made for their respective cities. Once there, they manned the countryside castles and awaited the Carthaginians.

Himilco arrived at Catana two days after the battle with the Carthaginian army after a 110 km trek around Mt. Etna, and his presence ensured security of the Punic fleet. Both the Punic army and navy were accorded a few days rest, during which time Mago repaired his damaged ships and refitted the captured Greek ships. Himilco took the time to negotiate with the Campanians at Aetna, offering them to switch sides. They had given Dionysius hostages and their best troops were serving with the Greek army, so they chose to stay loyal.

=== Preparations for the siege ===
Dionysius and the Greek army reached Syracuse first and began preparations for withstanding the inevitable Carthaginian siege. The forts around Leontini and Syracuse were fully manned and provisioned. Dionysius, shaken by the desertions of the Greek allies, also sent agents to hire mercenaries from Italy and Greece (Corinth, the mother city of Syracuse and Sparta, a fellow Doric ally were especially approached), including his kinsman Polyxenos. The fortresses were either to protect the harvest and serve as bases for harassing Carthaginian foragers or were to serve as bait and draw the Carthaginian army away from Syracuse, and gain time for Dionysius while Himilco reduced them. The fortresses would surrender easily and retain part of the Carthaginian force as garrisons.

Himilco ignored Leontini and the forts, and his army slowly marched to Syracuse. They moved round the Epipolae Plateau and concentrated on building their encampment. The Punic war-fleet, made up of 250 triremes and captured Greek quinqueremes, sailed into the Great Harbour at the same time and in perfect order sailed past Syracuse, displaying the spoils captured from the Greeks. 2000–3000 transports then moored in the harbour, bringing in soldiers and supplies. Himilco was ready to begin the siege. The Syracusan navy, which had initially mobilised 180 ships but lost 100 ships at the Catana, remained at port.

=== Fortifications of Syracuse ===
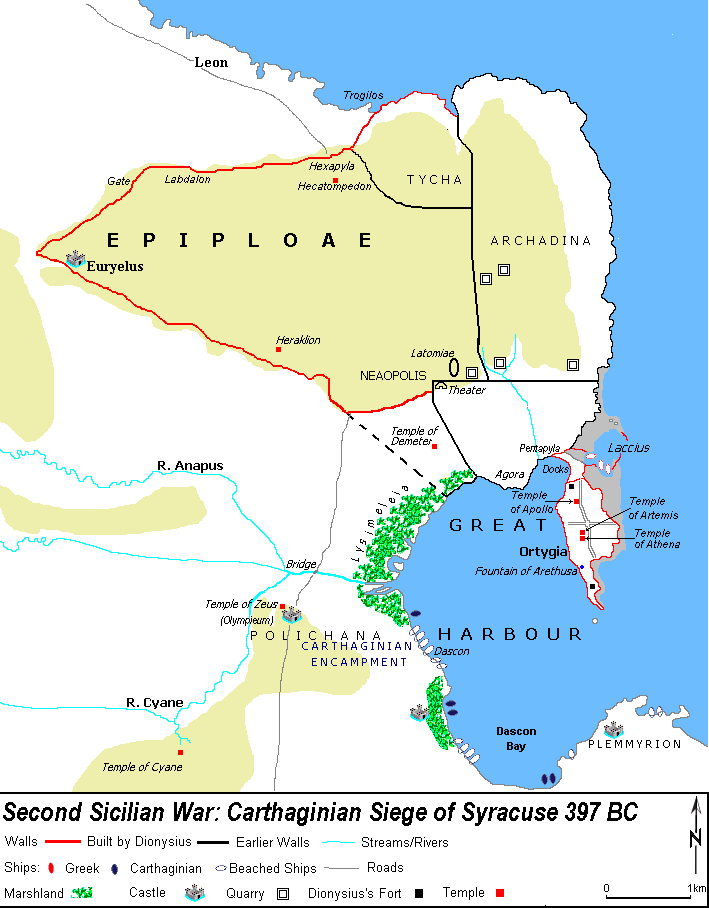
A generic representation of the Carthaginian siege of Syracuse in 397 BC – not to exact scale

The original city of Syracuse stood on the island Ortyga with some structures around the Agora in the mainland before the Sicilian Expedition in 415 BC, when walls were built around the Tycha and Archadina areas. After Dionysius finished adding to the existing structures, Syracuse possessed walls with the greatest circuit in the Greek world.

Dionysius had rebuilt the walls around Ortygia so that they surrounded the whole island and the isthmus connecting the mainland with a robust wall complete with towers at regular intervals which were strongly built. The isthmus had docks on the west side and the little harbour, Laccius on the east side. Screens and walls were put up to enclose Laccius, and it could accommodate 60 triremes, and a gate was provided between the sea screens that would let one trireme pass at a time. Two castles were also built on Ortygia, one near the isthmus, which was the home of Dionysius, and one further south. Two walls were built on the isthmus itself, one separating the island from the isthmus and one the mainland from the isthmus. A series of five gates built on the isthmus, the Pentaplya, controlled access between the mainland and Ortygia.

Dionysius then populated the island of Orytiga with loyal mercenaries and close supporters. A massive castle with underground structures was built at Euryalos which guarded the main access to the route to the Plateau. He incorporated the walls built during the Athenian Expedition for settling the people in Achradina. The walls around the plateau, made entirely of stone may have had a thickness between 2 and 4.5 meters and a height of 6 meters.

==== The Carthaginian camp ====
Himilco chose to camp next to the Great Harbour in the Polichana area. The camp was either 10 stadia from the Syracuse city walls, which would place it north of the Anapus river, or 12 stadia from the walls, totally south of the river. Himilco chose the temple of Zeus as his quarters. The main camp was probably situated on the marshy ground east of the temple of Zeus, and adjacent to the Dascon bay and the Lysimeleia marsh. The berthing facilities for the ships formed part of the camp, and the camp was surrounded by a moat and palisade.

==== Preliminary activities ====
Himilco marched north from his camp and formed up for battle near the city after the camp was put in order. One hundred Carthaginian warships also sailed out and took position on both sides of Ortygia, ready to counter any Greek ships should they sally forth. The Greeks stayed put inside Syracuse despite the jeers of the Punic soldiers. Himilco chose not to assault the walls, and it is unclear if he had siege engines with him at that time. Himilco then unleashed his soldiers around Syracuse to strip the land of all possible supplies, and ravaged the area for 30 days, possibly to intimidate the Greeks into surrendering before winter set in, and when this failed the Carthaginians went to winter quarters and began siege preparations.

== Carthaginian preparations ==
The Carthaginians now began preparing for a siege in earnest, Himilco built a fort near the temple of Zeus (it is unclear if the temple was inside the fort). Another fort was built at Dascon and one at Plemmyrion to safeguard the main camp and provide safer anchorage for his ships. The camp itself was surrounded by a regular wall in addition to the existing moat and palisade. The tombs of Gelon and his wife were demolished in the process of building the wall. Part of the fleet was dispersed while transport ships were sent to Sardinia and Africa to bring in more provisions. The forts were stocked with wine, corn, and all needful items, Himilco seemed to have spared no expense to look after his soldiers needs.

=== Carthaginian strategy ===
The Carthaginians had successfully besieged Greek cities in the past. In 409, they had stormed Selinus using siege engines, Himera was also a victim of Carthaginian besieging skills that same year, and in 406 the Carthaginians straddled Akragas by encamping on both sides of the city. The size of the Syracusan defences made building a circumvallation wall impractical. Himilco either wished to keep his forces concentrated or lacked the numbers to straddle Syracuse by building another camp, which also would have exposed Carthaginians to sudden attacks from Greeks in Syracuse or to a relief force without circumvallation walls linking both camps. A direct assault on the southern side exposed the attacking soldiers to a flank attack from the fort at Eryelus. The height of the walls on top of the plateau meant it might be impossible to assault the walls without building siege ramps.

Himilco basically adopted the same strategy that the Athenian leader Nicias had in 415 BC, staying put and awaiting favourable developments inside Syracuse. He went to winter quarters after completing his preparations and while Syracuse was under siege, it was not fully cut-off, Greek ships could sail in and out of the Laccius unless challenged by the Punic ships.

== Spring 397 BC: Carthage commences operations ==
Nothing of consequence happened during the winter of 397 BC as the adversaries played the waiting game from their respective positions. In the spring of 396 BC, Himilco began attacking the suburbs of Syracuse. There is no mention of Carthaginians breaching the city wall, but Punic soldiers captured a city section that contained several temples including one dedicated to Demeter and Kore, all of which were plundered. Dionysius also acted aggressively, sending out sorties to attack Carthaginian patrols and winning several skirmishes, but the overall tactical situation remained unchanged. In the meantime, Polyxenos had managed to gather a naval squadron in Greece, and under the command of Pharakidas of Sparta, 30 triremes managed to reach Syracuse. The Spartan had apparently captured a number of Punic ships, and the Carthaginian blockade ships had let his ships through thinking a Punic squadron was returning from patrol. The Greeks as well as the Carthaginians were now dependent on overseas supplies for sustaining their efforts.

=== Danger of success ===
Shortly after this event, Dionysius, along with his brother Leptines, sailed forth with a flotilla to escort a supply convoy crucial for Syracuse. It is not known who the commander was in Syracuse in their absence, but his actions netted a significant success for the Greeks. Firstly, after spotting an unescorted Punic corn ship in the Great Harbour, five Syracusan ships sailed out and captured it. While the prize was being brought in, 40 Punic ships sailed forth, and promptly the whole Syracusan navy (number of ships not mentioned, but probably outnumbering the Carthaginian contingent, there is no mention of who the admiral was) engaged the Punic squadron, sinking 4 ships and capturing 20 including the flagship. The Greek ships then advanced on the main Punic anchorage but Carthaginians declined the challenge. The Greeks then returned to Syracuse with their spoils.

This success was obtained without the leadership of Dionysius, and some of his political enemies tried to depose him upon his return at the citizen's assembly. The Spartans declined to support the dissenters and this caused the coup attempt to collapse. Some historians speculate that the sea battle and subsequent events never actually took place and are the work of anti-tyranny authors.

== Summer 396: the siege fails ==
A generic representation of Greek attacks on Carthaginian camps at Syracuse in 396 BC. Not to exact scale.

Whether the alleged naval battle took place or not, the strategic situation had not changed for the combatants when summer arrived in Sicily. Himilco had not been able to take Syracuse, Dionysius had failed to defeat the Punic forces, and both parties were reliant on overseas supplies. At this juncture a plague broke out among the Carthaginian troops, who had been suffering from the intense heat as well.

=== Plague ===
The plague, bearing similarities with the Athenian plague, may have been caused by bad hygienic practices on marshy grounds, and malaria may have played a part also. The result was that scores of soldiers and sailors succumbed to the disease, burial parties were overwhelmed, bodies were hastily buried, new burials were almost impossible, and the stench of decaying bodies hung in the air. Fear of infection may have prevented proper care being given to the sick.

The cause of this calamity was attributed to the desecration of Greek temples and tombs. At the siege of Akragas (406 BC) Himilco had dealt with a similar situation by sacrificing a child and various animals to appease this alleged divine anger. Whatever measures (if any) Himilco took at Syracuse to combat the plague proved ineffective; Punic forces were decimated and the fleet readiness was diminished. Himilco and the Carthaginians stubbornly stood their ground and remained in the camp, but the morale of the Carthaginians plummeted as a result of the plague, along with the combat effectiveness of their forces.

=== Dionysius strikes ===
Dionysius planned to take advantage of the situation by launching a combined land and sea attack on the Punic forces before they recovered or received reinforcements. Eighty ships were manned and, under the command of Leptines and Pharakidas, were to attack the Punic ships beached at the Bay of Dascon. Dionysius elected to command the soldiers attacking the Punic camp. He planned to march out on a moonless night with his army, and instead of going directly south to the Punic camp, march in a roundabout way to the Temple of Cyan and attack the Carthaginian fortifications at first light. The Greek fleet was to attack after Dionysius had engaged the Carthaginians. The success of the plan largely depended on the timely coordination between the fleet and the army, the absence of which had doomed another complicated battle plan of Dionysius in 405 BC at Gela.

==== Subtle treachery ====
Dionysius successfully completed his night march and reached Cyan. At daybreak, he sent his cavalry and 1,000 mercenaries to attack the camp directly from the west. This was a diversion, Dionysius had secretly ordered his horsemen to abandon the rebellious, untrustworthy mercenaries after they engaged the Carthaginians. The combined force attacked the camp, and the mercenaries were slaughtered after the Greek horsemen suddenly fled the field. Dionysius had succeeded in distracting the enemy and getting rid of some unreliable soldiers all at once.

=== Attack on the Punic forts ===
While the mercenaries were being butchered, the main Greek army launched attacks towards the forts near the temple of Zeus at Polichana and Dascon. The cavalry, after deserting the mercenaries, joined the attack on Dascon while part of the Greek fleet also sallied forth and attacked the Punic ships beached nearby. The Carthaginians were caught by surprise, and before they could put up a coordinated resistance, Dionysius managed to defeat the force outside the camp and then storm the fort at Polichana successfully, after which his force began to attack the Carthaginian camp and the temple. The Carthaginians managed to hold off the Greeks until nightfall, when the fighting stopped.

==== Punic fleet decimated at Dascon ====
The Punic fleet was undermanned as some of the crews had perished in the plague, and many of their ships were deserted. The Greek ships had also achieved total surprise, the Punic ships at Dascon, which included 40 quinqueremes, could not be manned and launched in time to face the assault and soon the whole Syracuse navy joined the attack. Greek ships rammed and sunk some as they lay at anchor, some ships were boarded and captured by Greek soldiers after a brief skirmish, while the horsemen, now led by Dionysius, set fire to some of the ships, some of which drifted away when their anchor cables burnt. Punic soldiers and sailors leapt into the water and swam ashore. The fire spread to the camp but was put out after part of the camp was burnt. The Punic army could not offer assistance as they were busy fending off attacking Greek soldiers. Some Greeks from Syracuse manned some of the merchant vessels and boats, sailed to Dascon and towed some of the derelict Punic ships away, along with whatever spoils they could scavenge. Meanwhile, the fort at Dascon had also fallen into Greek hands. Dionysius encamped with his army near the temple of Zeus at Polichana while the fleet returned to Syracuse.

=== A good days work ===
The Greeks had managed to capture the fort at Polichana and Dascon, but after a day's battle had ended, the Punic camp and temple of Zeus was still in Carthaginian hands, while a substantial part of their fleet also had survived. The initiative now lay with Dionysius, and barring reinforcements or unlooked for developments, a disaster comparable to the one at Himera might befall the Carthaginians unless Himilco acted to avert it.

== Strange political bedfellows ==
Greek tyrants, especially Gelo, Hiero and Dionysius are often credited with saving the Western civilization from barbarian machinations, especially by 16th −18th century historians. However, some of their activities have more to do with saving their rule than saving western civilization, as the actions of Dionysius were to show in 396 BC.

=== Himilco's dilemma ===
The Carthaginian forces had managed to survive the Greek attack, but they were still suffering from the plague, and to regain the initiative they had either to defeat the Greek army or the fleet, which was an impossible task at this stage. The Greek navy now probably outnumbered the Carthaginian one, which was devastated by the Greek raid and unable to man available ships due to crew shortage. The army was in no better condition to fight a successful pitched battle. Himilco was aware of the situation and opted to open secret negotiations with Dionysius that very night, while other Greek commanders were kept in the dark as the Italian and mainland Greek contingents were in favor of totally destroying the surviving Punic forces.

=== Duplicity of Dionysius ===
Dionysius was also ready to make a deal although he had a good chance of totally destroying the stricken Carthaginians. It has been alleged that as a tyrant, he needed to keep the threat of Carthage alive to keep the citizens of Syracuse in control; saving the west was not what he was trying to achieve. He responded to Himilco's overtures, but declined to let the Carthaginians simply sail away. After some haggling, the following terms were agreed on:

- Carthaginians would pay Dionysius 300 talents immediately
- Himilco was free to depart with the Carthaginian citizens unmolested at night. Dionysius could not guarantee their safety during the day.
- The Carthaginian departure would take place on the fourth night.

Himilco secretly sent 300 talents either to the fort at Polichana or to Syracuse itself. Dionysius withdrew his army to Syracuse as part of his bargain, and on the appointed night Himilco manned forty ships with the citizens of Carthage and sailed away. As this fleet passed the Great Harbour mouth, the Corinthians spotted them and informed Dionysius, who made a great show of arming his fleet but delayed calling his officers to give Himilco time to get away. The Corinthians, unaware of the secret pact, manned their ships and sailed out, managing to sink a few laggards, but the majority of Carthaginians ships managed to escape to Africa.

Dionysius marshalled his army after Himilco's departure and approached the Carthaginian camp, by which this time the Sicels had already slipped away to their homes and most of the remaining Punic soldiers surrendered to Dionysius. Some soldiers trying to flee were captured by the Greeks. The Iberians, who stood at arms ready to resist, were hired by Dionysius for his own army. The rest of the Punic prisoners were enslaved.

== Aftermath ==
Dionysius did not immediately march against the Punic possessions in Sicily but took time to order his realm. He probably did not wish to provoke Carthage more than necessary. The Sicilian Greek cities, which had thrown off the Carthaginian over-lordship, were more or less friendly with Syracuse. Solus was betrayed and sacked in 396 BC. Later, 10,000 mercenaries of Dionysius revolted after Dionysius arrested their commander Aristoteles of Sparta, and was placated only after their leader was sent to Sparta for judgement and the mercenaries received the city of Leontini to rule for themselves. Next Dionysius repopulated the ruined city of Messana with colonists from Italian and mainland Dorian Greeks, then founded Tyndaris with the original inhabitants of Messana who had been driven out after the Carthaginian sack of their city in 397 BC. Dionysius in 394 BC unsuccessfully besieged Tauromenium, then held by Sicels allied to Carthage. In response, Mago of Carthage led an army to Messana in 393 BC, and the war was renewed.

=== Carthage: plagued by problems ===
The return of Himilco, after abandoning his troops at the mercy of Dionysius, did not sit well with the Carthaginian citizens or their African subjects. Although the council of 104 did not crucify him, as unsuccessful Carthaginian commanders normally were, Himilco decided to do the deed himself. He publicly took full responsibility for the debacle, visited all the temples of the city dressed in rags and pleading for deliverance, and finally bricked himself inside his house and starved himself to death. Later, despite the sacrifice done to placate the Carthaginian gods, a plague swept through Africa, weakening Carthage. To top things off, the Libyans, angered by the desertion of their kinsmen in Africa, rebelled. They gathered an army of 70,000 and besieged Carthage.

Mago, the victor of Catana, took command. The standing Punic army was in Sicily and recruiting a new one was time consuming and probably very costly (Himilco's misdeed would have made mercenaries wary), so he rallied Carthaginian citizens to man the walls while the Punic navy kept the city supplied. Mago then used bribes and other means to quell the rebels. Carthaginians also built a temple for Demeter and Kore in the city and had Greeks offer proper sacrifice to atone for the destruction of the temple at Syracuse.

Mago next moved to Sicily, where he did not try to recover lost territory. Instead he adopted a policy of cooperation and friendship, giving aid to Greeks, Sikans, Sicels, Elymians and Punics regardless of their prior standing with Carthage. The Greeks' cities, who had thrown off Carthaginian over-lordship after the war started, now moved from a pro-Syracuse position to a more neutral one, either feeling threatened by Dionysius or because of the activities of Mago. This peaceful policy continued until Dionysius attacked the Sicels in 394 BC.

== Bibliography ==
- Baker, G. P. (1999). Hannibal. Cooper Square Press. ISBN 0-8154-1005-0.
- Bath, Tony (1992). Hannibal's Campaigns. Barnes & Noble. ISBN 0-88029-817-0.
- Church, Alfred J. (1886). Carthage (4th ed.). T. Fisher Unwin.
- Freeman, Edward A. (1892). Sicily: Phoenician, Greek & Roman (3rd ed.). T. Fisher Unwin.
- Freeman, Edward A. (1894). History of Sicily. Vol. IV. T. Fisher Unwin.
- Kern, Paul B. (1999). Ancient Siege Warfare. Indiana University Publishers. ISBN 0-253-33546-9.
- Lancel, Serge (1997). Carthage: A History. Blackwell Publishers. ISBN 1-57718-103-4.
- Warry, John (1993) [1980]. Warfare in The Classical World: An Illustrated Encyclopedia of Weapons, Warriors and Warfare in the Ancient Civilisations of Greece and Rome. New York: Barnes & Noble. ISBN 1-56619-463-6.
