= Siege of Lilybaeum (368 BC) =

Engagement in the Fifth Sicilian War

- Part of the Sicilian Wars
Date	368 BC
Location	Marsala, Sicily 37.799999°N 12.433333°E
Result	Carthaginian victory

Belligerents
Syracuse	Carthage

Commanders and leaders
Dionysius	Unknown

The siege of Lilybaeum in 368 BC was the second of three engagements fought between Syracuse and Carthage during the Sicilian Wars and was a major engagement in the Fifth Sicilian War.

The engagement was spearheaded by Dionysius (also spelt "Dionysus"), who had previously destroyed another settlement named Mozia during his conquest of Sicily, prompting the creation of Lilybaeum. Dionysius abandoned the siege because of the dense concentration of soldiers in the city.

Following the siege, Dionysius had received word that the Carthaginians' dockyards were destroyed alongside their entire fleet. He then sent around 130 triremes to Eryx, sending the rest of his fleet back to Syracuse. However, when the Carthaginians sailed around 200 ships to the harbor of Eryx, Dionysus' fleet was routed. Following the defeat, Dionysus fell sick and died.
