= Mago (fleet commander) =

Early 4th-century BC Carthaginian fleet commander

Mago (Punic: 𐤌𐤂𐤍, MGN; Ancient Greek: Μάγων, Mágōn) was commander of the Carthaginian fleet under Himilco in the war against Dionysius I of Syracuse, 396 BCE.

As commander of the Carthaginian fleet under Himilco in the great sea-fight off Catania (Catana), Mago completely defeated the fleet of the Syracusans under Leptines, the brother of Dionysius, sinking or destroying over 100 of their ships, as well as capturing many others. (Diod. xiv. 59, 60.)

There is no information as to his role in the subsequent operations against Syracuse itself. However, after the disastrous end to the Carthaginian expedition and the return of Himilco to Africa, Mago appears to have been given the chief command in Sicily, where he endeavoured, through lenient measures and conciliation towards the Greek cities and by concluding alliances with the Sicilian tribes, to re-establish the Carthaginian power on the island.

In 393 BCE he advanced against Messana (modern Messina), but was attacked and defeated by Dionysius near Abacaenum, which compelled him to remain quiet for a time. The next year, however, having received powerful reinforcements from Sardinia and North Africa, he assembled an army of 80,000 men, with which he advanced through the heart of Sicily as far as the Chrysas River, but was met there by Dionysius, who having secured the alliance of Agyris, tyrant of Agyrium, succeeded in cutting off the supplies of the enemy. As a result, Dionysius reduced the Carthaginians to such a level of distress that Mago was compelled to conclude a treaty of peace, through which he abandoned his allies, the Sicilians, to the power of Dionysius. (Id. xiv. 90, 95, 96.)

After this Mago returned to Carthage, where shortly after he was raised to the office of suffete, a position which he held in 383 BCE, when the ambition and intrigues of Dionysius led to the renewal of hostilities between Carthage and Syracuse. Mago landed in Sicily with a large army, and after numerous petty combats, a pitched battle took place, in which, after a severe contest, the Carthaginians were defeated and Mago was slain.

== See also ==
- Other Magos in Carthaginian history
