= Pharacidas =

Spartan admiral ca. 400 BCE

Pharacidas (Ancient Greek: Φαρακίδας) was a Spartan admiral sent to the assistance of Dionysius I against the Carthaginians, in the Greek-Punic Wars.

Diodorus Siculus wrote that Polyxenus (Πολύξενος), the brother-in law of Dionysius, arrived from the Peloponnesus and Italy, bringing thirty warships from his allies, with Pharacidas as admiral.

Polyaenus in his Strategems wrote about an incident between Pharacidas and the Carthaginian fleet. According to Polyaenus, Pharacidas forces attacked some Carthaginian ships and captured nine of them. In order to pass the Carthaginian's main fleet which was much larger than his, he manned the captured ships with his own troops and sailors. The Carthaginians, seeing their own ships thought that they were friendly and allowed them to pass. That way Pharacidas ships manage to enter into the harbor of Syracuse unharmed.
