= Battle of Messene =

4th-century BC battle in Sicily

Battle of Messene (397 BC)
- Part of The Sicilian Wars
Date	Spring, 397 BC
Location	Messene, Sicily
Result	Carthaginian Victory
Territorial changes	Ionian Greek city Messene sacked

Belligerents
Messene	Carthage

Commanders and leaders
Unknown	Himilco II, Mago

Strength
Unknown	50,000, 200 Triremes & 300 transports

Casualties and losses
Unknown	Unknown

The Battle of Messene took place in 397 BC in Sicily. Carthage, in retaliation for the attack on Motya by Dionysius, had sent an army under Himilco, to Sicily to regain lost territory. Himilco sailed to Panormus, and from there again sailed and marched along the northern coast of Sicily to Cape Pelorum, 12 miles (19 km) north of Messene. While the Messenian army marched out to offer battle, Himilco sent 200 ships filled with soldiers to the city itself, which was stormed and the citizens were forced to disperse to forts in the countryside. Himilco later sacked and leveled the city, which was again rebuilt after the war.

== Background ==
Carthage had stayed away from Sicilian affairs for seventy years after the defeat at Himera in 480 BC. However, Carthage, responding to the appeal for aid from Segesta against Selinus, had sent an expedition to Sicily under Hannibal Mago, and sacked Selinus and Himera in 409 BC. Responding to Greek raids on her Sicilian domain, Carthage launched another expedition that captured Akragas in 406 BC and Gela and Camarina in 405 BC. The conflict ended in 405 BC when Himilco and Dionysius, leader of the Carthaginian forces and tyrant of Syracuse respectively, concluded a peace treaty. The treaty left Carthage in direct or indirect control of 60 percent of Sicily but confirmed Dionysius as the ruler of Syracuse. Dionysius spent the years between 405 and 398 BC fortifying Syracuse, securing his power, enlarging his army and navy, and expanding the territory under his control. He also put down rebellions against his rule and hired workmen to create new weapons such as the catapult and new ships such as the quinquereme.

=== Dionysius tackles Carthage ===
In 398 BC, Dionysius sent an embassy to Carthage threatening to declare war unless they agreed to give up all Greek cities under their control. Before the embassy returned from Carthage, Dionysius let loose his mercenaries on Carthaginians living on Syracusan lands, putting them to the sword and plundering their property. He then set out for Motya with his army, accompanied by 200 warships and 500 transports carrying his supplies and war machines. Before he reached Motya, all the Greek cities and even some Sikan and Sicel ones had declared for him, killing Carthaginians and sending soldiers to join Dionysius, leaving only Panormus, Solus, Ancyrae, Segesta and Entella loyal to Carthage in Sicily. The army of Dionysius had swelled to 83,000 soldiers by the time it reached Motya. Dionysius captured Eryx, put Segesta and Entella under siege, then set about reducing Motya.

=== Motya falls ===
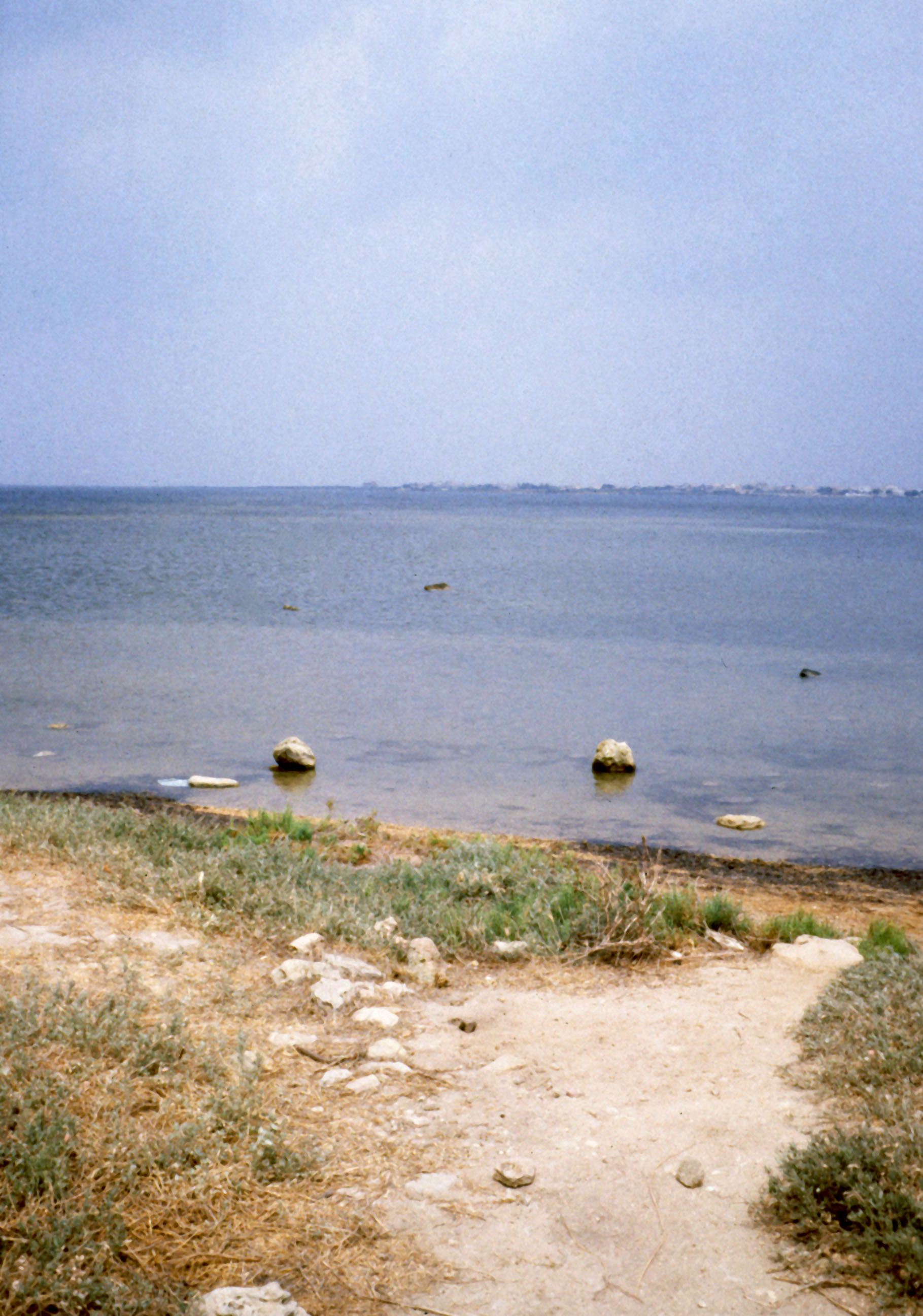
Beginning of the Motya mole connecting the city to the mainland.

Motya was a strongly fortified city on an island in the middle of a lagoon. The citizens prepared to resist after cutting up the mole connecting the city to the mainland. Dionysius had to repair the mole, then use siege towers to get his battering rams close to the walls, breach the walls, and then send his soldiers to attack the town. While his army was occupied with these activities, Himilco sailed from Carthage to Motya and managed to surprise the Greek navy, most of which was beached on the shore.

Himilco destroyed a large number of the transports and trapped the Greek warships on the northern part of the lagoon. Dionysius responded by building a wooden plank road on the isthmus north of Motya and dragging his triremes to the open sea. Outsmarted, Himilco withdrew his fleet. Dionysius then commenced his assault on Motya, which fell despite stubborn resistance. Dionysius sacked the city, garrisoned the ruins and, keeping Segesta and Entella under siege, returned to Syracuse with most of his fleet and army for the winter. His brother Leptines of Syracuse kept 120 ships at Eryx, including at least thirty quinqueremes.

== Carthage counters ==
Little is known of the activities of Carthage between 405 and 397, during which time Dionysius had muscled his way through Sicily and had already broken an existing treaty by making war on the Sicels. Carthage may have been weakened by the plague brought over from Sicily in 405. When Motya was put under siege and most cities in Sicily broke free of Carthaginian control, Carthage sent the aforementioned naval force under Himilco, which achieved nothing. Carthage did not have a standing army, so nothing else could be done before enough mercenaries had been hired and marshalled. Carthage had begun to recruit an army and man a fleet to send to Sicily. The final army may have included 50,000 infantry, 4,000 cavalry, and 400 chariots, while the fleet included 400 triremes and 600 transports.

Himilco, now elected "king", sailed for Sicily in 397 with the army and fleet. He had given sealed orders to the ship captains so that the actual destination was not revealed. The Punic fleet made for Panormus, and encountered the fleet of Leptines en route, which could do little except sink fifty transports, containing 5,000 men and 200 chariots, while an opportune wind helped the other transports to escape. From Panormus, where 30,000 Sicilians joined his army, Himilco marched to Motya, capturing the city of Eryx through treachery on the way. Motya housed a mostly Sicel garrison under an officer named Biton, which was overcome easily. Himilco did not start rebuilding Motya, instead, he chose to build a city at Lilybaeum. His next task was to raise the siege of Segesta, where the Greeks fled at the approach of the Carthaginians.

== Path to Messene ==
While Himilco was busy dealing with Motya, Dionysius lifted the siege of Segesta and Entella and moved back to Syracuse. The Segestans had given the Greeks a hard time during the siege, managing to sally out at night and burn down the Greek camp. Dionysius probably chose not to confront the Carthaginians in Western Sicily because he was facing a superior army in Elymian territory (where only two cities had supported him, out of which Eryx had fallen, and the Halicyans, who had made an alliance with Dionysius after the fall of Motya, was about to switch sides again).

Messene, previously known as Zankle, was one of the Greek cities which had treaties with Carthage in 480. Carthage and Syracuse had both pledged to honor the independence of Messene and Sicels in the treaty of 405. As Dionysius had broken the treaty in 404 and furthermore Messene had joined Syracuse, Carthage was no longer bound by the treaty. The previous campaign led by Himilco in 406 had progressed eastward along the southern coast of Sicily toward Syracuse. Moreover, the cities subdued by Carthage in that expedition, Akragas, Gela, and Camarina, lay along this route, the capture of which would yield much booty and subtract allies from Syracuse. Himilco chose not to go this way, perhaps preferring to attack Syracuse directly.

The Carthaginian army returned to Panormus, and after leaving enough forces to defend the Carthaginian domain, Himilco sailed eastwards to Messene with 600 warships and transports. He did not even stop at Thermae to punish the city for rebellion but continued to Lipira, where he coaxed thirty talents of silver as tribute. All the Sicels except the Asserini had deserted the cause of Dionysius by this time, and Himilco made treaties with Thermae and Cephaledion to safeguard his supply route. From Lipara the Punic fleet sailed east and the Carthaginian army was disembarked at Cape Pelorum, 12 miles (19 km) north of Messene.

Himilco led the Carthaginian force of 50,000 men along with 400 triremes and 600 transports to Sicily in 397. The Carthaginians were joined by 30,000 Sicilians (Sicels, Sikans and Elymians), but it is not known what forces Himilco left behind to guard western Sicily when he sailed to Lipara with 300 triremes and 300 transports. The Carthaginian army encamped at Cape Peloris near the sanctuary of Posidon.

Large Sicilian cities like Syracuse and Akragas could field up to 10,000–20,000 citizens, while smaller ones like Himera and Messana mustered between 5,000 and 6,000 soldiers. Messana had mobilized 30 triremes against Syracuse in 399 BC.

=== Carthaginian cohorts ===
The Libyans supplied both heavy and light infantry and formed the most disciplined units of the army. The heavy infantry fought in close formation, armed with long spears and round shields, wearing helmets and linen cuirasses. The light Libyan infantry carried javelins and a small shield, same as Iberian light infantry. The Iberian infantry wore purple-bordered white tunics and leather headgear. The heavy infantry fought in a dense phalanx, armed with heavy throwing spears, long body shields, and short thrusting swords. Campanian, Sardinian and Gallic infantry fought in their native gear, but often were equipped by Carthage. Sicels and other Sicilians were equipped like Greek hoplites.

The Libyans, Carthaginian citizens, and the Libyo-Phoenicians provided disciplined, well-trained cavalry equipped with thrusting spears and round shields. Numidia provided superb light cavalry armed with bundles of javelins and riding without bridle or saddle. Iberians and Gauls also provided cavalry, which relied on the all-out charge. Carthage at this time did not use elephants, but Libyans provided the bulk of the heavy, four horse war chariots for Carthage. Himilco had lost his chariots when 50 of his transports were sunk by the Greeks off Eryx and none seemed to have served at Messana. Carthaginian officer corps held overall command of the army, although many units may have fought under their chieftains.

The Punic navy was built around the trireme, Carthaginian citizens usually served alongside recruits from Libya and other Carthaginian domains in the fleet. Carthaginians favoured light, maneuverable crafts and they carried an extra sail for speed but fewer number of soldiers than their Greek counterparts. Carthaginian forces had encountered Syracusan quinqueremes at Motya and are credited with inventing the quadriremes, but it is not known if these ship types were present during the Messana campaign.

=== Greek forces ===
The mainstay of the Greek army was the hoplite, drawn mainly from the citizens, although mercenaries from Italy and Greece were also employed. The cavalry was recruited from wealthier citizens and hired mercenaries, while some citizens would also serve as peltasts, and mercenaries could be hired to fill the role of archers, slingers, and skirmishers. The Messanian fleet used triremes as the standard fighting ship, but their status and location during this battle is unknown.

== Battle of Messene ==
The walls of Messene had fallen into disrepair, and the city was not prepared for a siege. Furthermore, their cavalry and some soldiers were away serving with the army of Syracuse. This made the government of Messene decide to fight the Carthaginians away from the city, and accordingly, most of the men marched north to confront the Carthaginians near their encampment. The Carthaginian army vastly outnumbered the Greeks, and their fleet dominated the sea. The actual objective of the Greeks in marching north is unknown, they may have only intended to make contact and keep watch on their enemies unless Himilco only had a part of his army present. The possibility of a naval adventure probably was not considered by Greek leaders. A prophecy had said that the Carthaginians will be water carriers in Messene, which probably had emboldened the Greeks into going up against superior forces. Many of the women, children, and valuables were removed from the city before the Greeks marched out.

=== Outflanking move against Messana ===
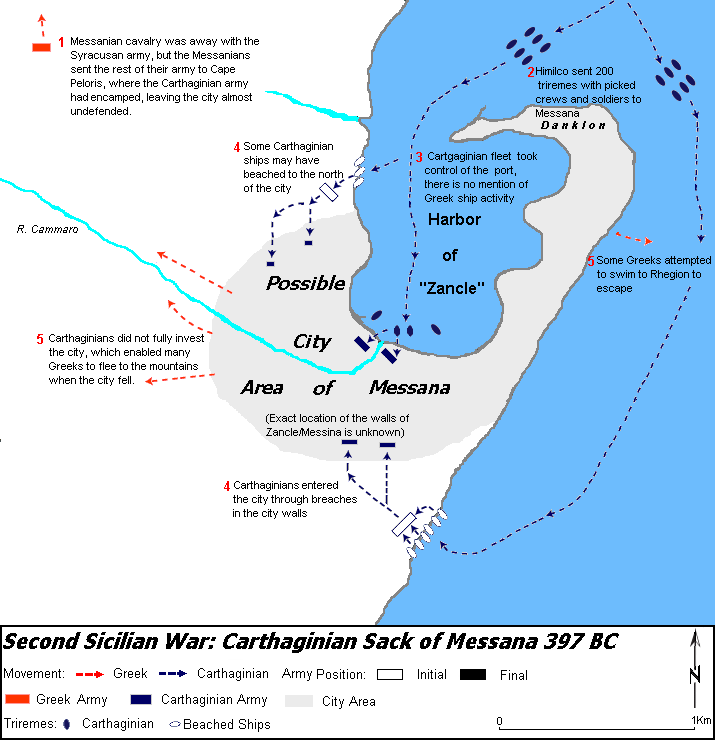
Carthaginian assault on Messana. A generic representation of a possible scenario, not to exact scale and path of troop movement and geographical features are indicative only because of lack of primary source data.

Himilco did nothing against the Greek army approaching his camp. It is not known whether Messana had any ships at that time or their role in the coming battle. Himilco, informed about the approaching Greek army, decided to outflank them using his naval superiority. He however ordered 200 triremes to be manned by picked crews and soldiers, and sail for Messana, thus outflanking the Greeks and attacking the undefended city directly. The trireme normally carried 200 rowers and 16 crew members (including the ship captain) and between 14 and 40 marines, so the Carthaginian strike force probably numbered between 2,400 and 8,000 soldiers. The rowers, hard to replace trained professionals, were unlikely to be used on land battles, but the crew could be added to the troops, augmenting the force by another 3,000. The ships could have been packed over their normal contingent, but it is unknown to what extent because triremes could be unsettled by heavily armored marines moving on deck, who were required to sit down when the ship was sailing. The name of the expedition commander is not known, but Mago, the future victor of the Catana and a kinsman of Himilco, may have been the person in charge.

While part of the Carthaginian army assembled on the shore in Cape Peloris, 200 triremes, packed with picked soldiers and rowers sailed south to Messene. This contingent quickly reached the city, aided by the north wind, and landed the soldiers near Messene before the Greeks could double back. After taking control of the harbor, Carthaginians entered the city, while part of their forces may have landed to the north and/or south of the city and attacked the place from both landward and seaward side, many Carthaginians had gained access through breaches in the city wall.

The Carthaginians stormed the city, which fell quickly, but the city was not fully invested as some of the existing population managed to escape and scatter to various fortresses dotting the countryside. The soldiers of Messene also joined their families in the fortresses once the news of the capture of the city reached them.

== Aftermath ==
After the Greeks established colonies at Lipara, Messana and Rhegion, the Etruscans had clashed with them to gain control of this strategic site and prey on Greeks. Part of the fabulous wealth of Sybaris came from their control over a road from Sybaris to Paestum which allowed traders to bypass the pirates at the Strait of Messina, control over which was a source on income for Messana. Himilco had captured both Lipara and Messana in a space of two days, a feat Etruscans could not manage in a century of conflict. The capture of Messana gave the Carthaginians temporary control over the Strait of Messina, plus a harbor large enough to house the entire Punic fleet of 600 ships, and also put them in a position to hinder naval traffic between Italy and Sicily. The Carthaginians were also in a position to ally with Rhegion, which was hostile to Syracuse.

== Strategic considerations ==
Himilco chose not to set up base at Messana, he probably was not confident about holding the city this far away from Carthage. Himilco next tried to reduce the fortresses in which the people of Messene had taken refuge, but gave up the attempt, as this proved too time-consuming, and kept him from attacking Syracuse, where Dionysius would use any extra time to strengthen himself further. The ultimate Carthaginian goal was the defeat of Syracuse, Messana was just a sideshow. Bringing reinforcements from Carthage would also be time-consuming as Carthage had no standing army and would need time to raise fresh mercenaries, while dividing the field army to guard Messana would decrease his striking power against Dionysius. After sacking and destroying the city, the Carthaginian army marched south along the eastern coast of Sicily, while their fleet sailed alongside. Dionysius had destroyed the cities of Naxos and Catana while expanding his power, giving Naxos to the Sicels and Catana to Campanian mercenaries. This meant fewer obstacles for Himilco to overcome along this route than along the southern coast of Sicily. Himilco could not entirely ignore the hostile Greek fortresses in his rear, as they might cause problems once he left the site. His solution was simple and ingenious at the same time, something that is termed indirect approach.

=== Tauromenium founded ===
Himilco chose to plant a city at Mt. Taurus, where some Sicels had already settled, and populated it with allied Sicels and fortified the place, and in doing so killed several birds with a single stone. The city was near enough to block any Greek movements from Messana but was far enough away not to fall victim to a surprise attack, and it could serve as a future base of operations. Furthermore, all the Sicels hated Dionysius and except those from Assorus, they now abandoned the Greeks and either joined Himilco or went to their respective homes, decreasing the strength of Dionysius without Carthaginians striking a single blow. Epaminondas in 370 used the same strategy when he rebuilt Messene and founded Megalopolis in Spartan territory after failing to take Sparta by force, and decreased their territory and manpower successfully.

The city of Messene would later be rebuilt and cause trouble for both Carthage and Syracuse. Dionysius in the meantime was hiring mercenaries, building ships, freeing slaves to man them and strengthening the fortifications of Syracuse and Leontini. After persuading the inhabitants of Catania (who were Campanians and had been settled there by Dionysius after he drove the original Greek inhabitants away) to move to Aetna, Dionysius made for Tauromenium with both his army and fleet. However, the belligerents were not destined to clash there.

== See also ==
- Not to be confused with the Battle of Messana (265–264 BC) that started the First Punic War.

== Sources ==
- Baker, G. P. (1999). Hannibal. Cooper Square Press. ISBN 0-8154-1005-0.
- Bath, Tony (1992). Hannibal's Campaigns. Barns & Noble. ISBN 0-88029-817-0.
- Church, Alfred J. (1886). Carthage (4th ed.). T. Fisher Unwin.
- Freeman, Edward A. (1892). Sicily: Phoenician, Greek & Roman (3rd ed.). T. Fisher Unwin.
- Kern, Paul B. (1999). Ancient Siege Warfare. Indiana University Publishers. ISBN 0-253-33546-9.
- Lancel, Serge (1997). Carthage: A History. Blackwell Publishers. ISBN 1-57718-103-4.
- Warry, John (1993) [1980]. Warfare in the Classical World: An Illustrated Encyclopedia of Weapons, Warriors and Warfare in the Ancient Civilisations of Greece and Rome. New York: Barnes & Noble. ISBN 1-56619-463-6.
- Whitaker, Joseph I.S. (1921). Motya: A Phoenician Colony in Sicily. G. Bell & Sons.
