= Leptines of Syracuse =

Syracusan Greek general (died 375 BC)

Leptines (Ancient Greek: Λεπτίνης; died 375 BC) was a military leader from Syracuse, Sicily, Magna Graecia, active during his brother, Dionysius the Elder's wars. He showed bravery in the fights against Carthage and mercy with the Thurians.

== Biography ==
Leptines was a brother of Dionysius the Elder, tyrant of Syracuse. He is first mentioned as commanding his brother's fleet at the Siege of Motya (397 BCE), and was for some time entrusted by Dionysius with overall command of the siege, while Dionysius was engaged in reducing the other towns still held by the Carthaginians. (Diod. xiv. 48.)

== Naval battles ==
After the fall of Motya Leptines was stationed there with a fleet of 120 ships to watch for and intercept the Carthaginian fleet under Himilco. However, Himilco eluded his vigilance and the greater part of his fleet was able to sail to Panormus (modern Palermo) in safety although Leptines did pursue them and was able to sink fifty of Himilco's transports, containing 5000 troops. (Id. 53–55.)

The state of affairs was now changed: Himilco was able to advance unopposed along the north coast of the island and took and destroyed Messana (modern Messina); from where he advanced on Syracuse. Himilco's fleet, under Mago, supporting the operations of the army.

Dionysius ordered Leptines to immediately advance with the Syracusan fleet to engage Mago's fleet and a great naval action ensued, in which Leptines displayed the utmost valor. However, having imprudently advanced with thirty of his best ships into the midst of the enemy, he was cut off from the rest of his fleet, and only able to escape by setting course to the open sea.

The result was that the Syracusans were defeated with significant losses. Many of their ships fell into the hands of the enemy with Leptines retreating with the rest of the fleet to Syracuse. During the siege that followed, Leptines continued to render important services and commanded (together with the Lacedaemonian Pharacidas) the final attack upon the naval camp of the Carthaginians which ended in the complete destruction of the Carthaginian fleet.

== Actions in Italy and exile ==
Nothing more is recorded about Leptines until 390 BC, when he was again dispatched by Dionysius with a fleet to the assistance of the Lucanians against the Italian Greeks. He arrived just as the Greeks had achieved a great victory over the Thurians. However, instead of joining them to crush their enemies, he gave refuge to the Thurian fugitives and succeeded in achieving peace between the contending parties. For this conduct, which was entirely opposite to the views of Dionysius, he was deprived of the command of the fleet, which was given to his younger brother, Thearides. (Id. xiv. 102.) Some time afterward he further offended Dionysius, by giving one of his daughters in marriage to Philistus, without any discussion with Dionysius. As a result, he was banished by Dionysius from Syracuse, together with Philistus.

Leptines and Philistus moved to Thurii, where the services Leptines had rendered to that city during the recent war with the Lucanians meant that they were favorably received. Leptines quickly rose in power and influence among the Greeks of Italy to the point that Dionysius judged it prudent to recall his sentence of banishment and invite Leptines to return to Syracuse. Once Leptines returned, he was completely reinstated in Dionysius' favor and received the hand of Dionysius' daughter, Dicaeosyne, in marriage. (Diod. xv. .7; Plut. Dion. 11.)

== Death ==
In 383 BC, with war having again broken out with the Carthaginians, Leptines once more took an active part in supporting his brother, and commanded the right wing of the Syracusan army in the battle near Cronium, around 375 BC. After displaying the greatest personal prowess, Leptines fell in the action and the troops under his command immediately gave way. (Diod. xv. 17.)

== See also ==
- Leptines II
