= Battle of Catana (397 BC) =

Naval battle of the Sicilian War

- Part of The Sicilian Wars
- Punic Victory at Catana 397 BC. Political boundaries and path of troop movement are inexact because of lack of primary source data. Source map created by Marco Prins-Jona Lendering
Date	Summer 397 BC
Location	Catana, Sicily
Result	Carthaginian victory

Belligerents
Carthage	Syracuse; Sicilian Greeks

Commanders and leaders
Mago	Leptines of Syracuse

Strength
200 Triremes; 300 Transports	180 ships, mostly Quinqueremes

Casualties and losses
Light	100 ships sunk/captured 20,000 sailors drowned/captured

The Battle of Catana took place in the summer of 397 BC. The Greek fleet under Leptines, the brother of Dionysius I of Syracuse, engaged the Carthaginian fleet under Mago near the city of Catana in Sicily. While the Greek army under Dionysius was present near the city of Catana during the battle, the Carthaginian army under Himilco was away in the interior of Sicily, making a detour around the erupting Mount Etna. The Carthaginian fleet crushed the Greek fleet in the battle, leading to the Carthaginian siege of Syracuse later in 397 BC.

== Background ==
Carthage had invaded Sicily in 406 BC in retaliation of Greek raids on Phoenician lands. The expedition, first commanded by Hannibal Mago, and, after the battle of Akragas, by his kinsman Himilco, had managed to capture and sack the cities of Akragas, Gela and Camarina by the summer of 405. These defeats had caused political turmoil in Syracuse, and had ultimately brought Dionysius I of Syracuse to power as tyrant. Himilco and Dionysius signed a peace treaty to end the conflict in 405 BC, which had left Carthage in direct or indirect control of 3/5th of Sicily. The Sicels and the cities of Messina and Leontini were left independent while Dionysius was acknowledged as the ruler of Syracuse by Carthage.

=== Dionysius in charge ===
Between 405 BC and 398 BC, Dionysius set about securing his political position and increasing the military might of Syracuse. He broke the treaty in 404 BC by starting a war with the Sicels. While Carthage did nothing, Dionysius was put in a difficult position by a revolt in his army, which managed to besiege Dionysius in Syracuse. Fortune and incompetence of his enemies had helped Dionysius to ultimately emerge triumphant from this crisis. Dionysius then enlarged his territory by conquering and sacking the cities of Naxos and Catana, and annexing Leontini. He hired mercenaries and enlarged his fleet building 200 new ships. The city of Syracuse was fortified, with Dionysius making the island of Ortygia (where the original city of Syracuse stood) into a fortress and encompassing the whole of Epipolae Platue by massive walls. He hired workmen to create new weapons like the catapult and new ships like the quinquereme. In 398 BC, Dionysius attacked the Phoenician city of Motya in Western Sicily with an army of 80,000 infantry and 3,000 cavalry, along with a fleet of 200 warships and 500 transports carrying his supplies and war machines.

The Sicilian Greeks and Sikans under Carthaginian dominion took this opportunity to rebel, and by the time Dionysius besieged Motya, only five cities remained in league (Segesta, Entella, Panormus and Solus among them) with Carthage. Lacking a standing army, Carthage could only send a fleet of 100 triremes under Himilco to Sicily. The city of Motya stands on an island in the middle of a lagoon, so Dionysius had to build a mole to reach the city walls. While the Greeks were thus occupied, Himilco managed to surprise the Greek fleet and trap them on the lagoon north of Motya. Most of the Greek ships were beached, and Himilco had destroyed the transports at anchor near Lilybaeum before sailing to Motya. Dionysius managed to hold the Carthaginian fleet off by catapult fire, while his men built a wooden road of planks on the isthmus north of Motya and dragged 80 triremes to the open sea. Himilco, outnumbered and outmaneuvered, was compelled to sail away. Dionysius then assaulted Motya after the mole was finished, the city fell after fierce resistance, and was thoroughly sacked. After garrisoning the city, Dionysius left 120 ships under his brother Leptines at Eryx, put Segesta under siege and retired to Syracuse for the winter.

=== Road to Catana ===
Himilco, elected king by the Carthaginians, led the army raised by Carthage, probably 50,000 men along with 300 triremes and 600 transports to Sicily. The Greek fleet under Leptines of Syracuse failed to stop the Punic armada, only managing to sink 50 transports. The Carthaginians landed at Panormus, then made their way to Eryx, which was occupied through treachery. Himilco next stormed Motya, where the mostly Sicel garrison under Biton was easily overcome. The Carthaginians then lifted the siege of Segesta, and Dionysius retired to Syracuse instead of offering battle in Western Sicily against a superior army. Himilco returned to Panormus, garrisoned the Carthaginian territories, and then sailed to Lipara with 300 warships and 300 transports. After collecting 30 talents of silver as tribute from Lipara, Himilco sailed to Cape Pelorum and landed his army. The army of Messene marched north from the city to the cape to confront the Carthaginians. Himilco sent 200 ships filled with picked soldiers and rowers to Messene, which was easily captured and sacked. The Greeks then dispersed to the fortresses in the countryside. Himilco spent some time trying to reduce the forts, but gave up the time-consuming endeavor.

== Prelude to Catana ==
Himilco chose not to set up base at Messene, which would have given him control over the strait and a harbor that could house his entire fleet, and also put him in a position to hinder naval traffic between Italy and Sicily. Himilco probably was not confident about holding the city this far away from Carthage. Furthermore, the majority of the Greeks of Messana were holed up in the hill fortresses nearby, and reducing them required time, which in turn would enable Dionysius to strengthen himself for the coming battle. The ultimate Carthaginian goal was the defeat of Syracuse, Messana was just a sideshow. Bringing reinforcements from Carthage would be time-consuming as Carthage had no standing army and would need time to raise fresh mercenaries, while dividing the field army to guard Messana would decrease his striking power against Dionysius. Himilco on the other hand could not entirely ignore the hostile Greek fortresses in his rear, as they might cause problems once he left the site. His solution was simple and ingenious at the same time, something that is termed indirect approach.

=== Tauromenium founded ===
Himilco marched south and chose to plant a city at Mt. Taurus, where some Sicels had already settled, and populated it with allied Sicels and fortified the place, and in doing so killed several birds with a single stone. The city was near enough to block any Greek movements from Messana but was far enough away not to fall victim to a surprise attack, and it could serve as a future base of operations. Furthermore, all the Sicels hated Dionysius and, except those from Assorus, they now abandoned the Greeks and either joined Himilco or went to their respective homes, decreasing the strength of Dionysius without the Carthaginians striking a single blow. Epaminondas in 370 BC used the same strategy when he rebuilt Messene and founded Megalopolis in Spartan territory after failing to take Sparta by force, and decreased their territory and manpower successfully. Himilco had managed to detach allies away from Dionysius, and at the same time gained allies to block any activity by the still hostile Greeks of Messese in his rear. The Carthaginians resumed marching south along the coast, while the Punic fleet sailed alongside. A severe eruption of Mt. Etna made the path north of Naxos impassable, so Himilco had to risk dividing his forces. While the army under Himilco marched to detour around Mt. Etna, Mago with the fleet sailed on to Catana along the coast, where he was to meet up with Carthaginian army.

While Himilco was capturing Messene and building Tauromenium, Dionysius was busy strengthening his forces. He freed all the slaves in Syracuse to man 60 additional ships, provisioned the fortresses at Syracuse and Leontini with soldiers and supplies, and hired 1,000 mercenaries from Greece. His next move was to persuade the Campanian mercenaries at Catana to move to Aetna. When he received news that Himilco had been forced to march inland due to the eruption of Mt. Etna, and the Punic fleet was sailing for Catana, he took his army and fleet to Catana to defeat the Carthaginians in detail. The Greek army numbered 30,000 foot and 3,000 horse, while the fleet had 180 ships, mostly made of quinqueremes.

== Opposing forces ==
Himilco had led the Carthaginian force of 50,000 men along with 300 triremes and 300 transports to Sicily in 397 BC. The Carthaginians were joined by 30,000 Sicilians (Sicels, Sikans and Elymians), but it is not known what forces Himilco left behind to guard Western Sicily when he sailed to Lipara with 300 triremes and 300 transports. After the Carthaginian forces split up, Mago took command of 200 triremes and 300 transports as the Punic fleet sailed to Catana.

Dionysius had mustered an army of 40,000 foot and 3,000 horsemen, from both citizens and mercenaries (at least 10,000, if not more) for attacking Motya in 398 BC, perhaps along with 40,000 Greek, Sicel and Sikan volunteers. At Catana in 397 BC Dionysius commanded 30,000 foot and 3,000 horse, which included Sicels and Sicilian Greek contingents, while part of the army was guarding Syracuse and Leontini. Leptines commanded the fleet, which was made of 180 Quinqueremes and triremes.

=== Punic navy ===
Carthaginians favoured light, maneuverable crafts and they carried an extra sail for speed but fewer soldiers than their Greek counterparts. Carthaginian forces had encountered Syracusan quinqueremes at Motya and are credited with inventing the quadrireme, but it is not known if these ship types were present at Catana in 397 BC. Mago, the Carthaginian admiral, had installed rams on his transports to augment the striking power of his fleet.

=== Greek navy ===
Dionysius had launched a massive building program between 404–398 BC. Syracuse built 200 new ships and refitted 110 old ones, many being quadrireme and quinqueremes. Leptines had commanded a fleet of 200 warships and 500 transports to Motya in 398 BC, while the Carthaginians had destroyed a large number of ships at Syracuse and Motya. The Greek fleet had shrunk below 150 warships by 397 BC from attrition and battle losses, and Dionysius, short of cash, had to free slaves to man 60 additional ships, bringing the fleet up to 180 ships at Catana. Dionysius preferred larger and heavier ships, and with the fleet mainly being composed of quinqueremes, they carried more missile troops and marines than their Carthaginian counterparts.

== Battle of Catana ==
The Carthaginian fleet was sailing at a slow pace to give Himilco more time to catch up. The Carthaginian fleet at this time contained 300 triremes and 200 transports. To maximize the fighting potential of the fleet, the Carthaginians had armed the transports, (which were slower than the warships) with rams. The Punic fleet arrived at Catana, aware that without their army present, they were vulnerable to the Greek army when they beached their ships at night. If the fleet anchored at sea, they would be vulnerable to bad weather.

When the Greeks arrived at Catana, Leptines, the admiral, marshaled his ships and advanced on the Carthaginians. Although the Greek fleet was outnumbered, their ships were larger and heavier, and carried more soldiers and missile troops on board. Dionysius, planning to make full use of his heavier ships and larger missile troop contingent, had ordered Leptines to keep his ships in close order when engaging the Carthaginians. Seeing the Greeks deploy for action, Mago ordered his fleet to sea and started to form up the battle line.

Leptines selected 30 of his best ships and charged headlong into the Carthaginian line, while the rest of his fleet struggled to catch up with him. At first Leptines carried all before him in his sudden sally, disabling/sinking many Punic ships in a wild melee. The Carthaginians began to use their advantage in numbers, grappling the Greek ships so they could not maneuver, then boarding them. The battle turned against Leptines, and left without any reinforcements, he had to break combat and escape to the open sea with the survivors of his contingent, leaving the Greek fleet leaderless in the coming battle.

As the rest of the Greek fleet came in disorder into the battle scene, the Carthaginians, formed up and ready, turned on them en masse. A fierce battle ensued, with ships exchanging darts, maneuvering to ram their counterparts and grapple each other for boarding. The Greeks were ultimately overwhelmed, their heavier ships and superior missile troops being of little use partly because of their disordered formation. The Carthaginians sent out boats to capture/kill the Greek sailors swimming in the water. Over 20,000 soldiers/rowers and 100 ships were lost before the surviving Greek ships could flee.

== Aftermath ==
The defeat of the Greeks put Dionysius in a difficult position. With the Greek fleet beaten, Mago had gained the option of making a dash at Syracuse itself, repeating the feat the Carthaginians had pulled off at Messene on Syracuse. On the other hand, if Dionysius could now attack and defeat the army of Himilco, Mago would be compelled to fall back to a secure base. Dionysius also had to keep in mind the possibility of political trouble in Syracuse while deciding his strategy. The Greek army was opposed to facing a siege, and at first Dionysius was inclined to seek the Carthaginian army out and measure swords with Himilco. His advisers pointed out the threat of Mago and his fleet capturing Syracuse, and Dionysius decided to break camp, leave Catana and march south to Syracuse.

At this juncture, worsening weather forced Mago to beach his ships, thus making the Punic fleet vulnerable to the Greek army attacks. Dionysius commenced his retreat prior to this, with the remnant of his fleet sailing parallel along the coast. This decision to face a siege proved so unpopular among the Sicilian Greek allies that they deserted the army and made for their respective cities. Once there, they manned the countryside castles and awaited the Carthaginians.

Himilco arrived at Catana two days after the battle with the Carthaginian army, his presence ensuring security of the Punic fleet. Both the Punic army and the navy were accorded a few days rest, during which time Mago repaired his damaged ships and refitted the captured Greek ships. Himilco took the time to negotiate with the Campanians at Aetna, offering them to switch sides. They had given Dionysius hostages and their best troops were still serving with the Greek army, so they chose to stay loyal to the Greek tyrant. The victory at Catana enabled the Carthaginians to proceed and lay siege to Syracuse in 397 BC. It not only reduced the naval power of Syracuse, but it also decreased the strength of the Greek's army by causing other Sicilian Greeks to desert Dionysius.

== Bibliography ==
- Baker, G. P. (1999). Hannibal. Cooper Square Press. ISBN 0-8154-1005-0.
- Bath, Tony (1992). Hannibal's Campaigns. Barnes & Noble. ISBN 0-88029-817-0.
- Church, Alfred J. (1886). Carthage (4th ed.). T. Fisher Unwin.
- Freeman, Edward A. (1892). Sicily: Phoenician, Greek & Roman (3rd ed.). T. Fisher Unwin.
- Kern, Paul B. (1999). Ancient Siege Warfare. Indiana University Publishers. ISBN 0-253-33546-9.
- Lancel, Serge (1997). Carthage: A History. Blackwell Publishers. ISBN 1-57718-103-4.
- Warry, John (1993) [1980]. Warfare in The Classical World: An Illustrated Encyclopedia of Weapons, Warriors and Warfare in the Ancient Civilisations of Greece and Rome. New York: Barnes & Noble. ISBN 1-56619-463-6.
