= Sicilian Wars =

Series of wars in Magna Graecia (580–265 BC)

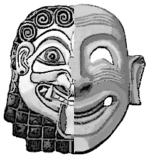
- Symbolic portrait of Greek-Carthaginian interaction in Sicily: to the left the Greek Gorgon and to the right the Phoenician-Punic "grinning" mask.
Date	580–265 BC
Location	Sicily, North Africa, Sardinia, Tyrrhenian Sea, Ionian Sea, Strait of Sicily, southern Italy
Result	Inconclusive
Territorial changes	Carthage retains Western Sicily and the Greeks the eastern part until the Punic Wars

Belligerents
Carthage	Greek city-states of Sicily, led by Syracuse

Commanders and leaders
Hamilcar Mago †; Hannibal Mago †; Himilco; Mago II; Mago III	Gelo; Dionysius I Timoleon; Agathocles of Syracuse

The Sicilian Wars, or Greco-Punic Wars, were a series of conflicts fought between ancient Carthage and the Greek city-states led by Syracuse over control of Sicily and the western Mediterranean between 580 and 265 BC.

Carthage's economic success and its dependence on seaborne trade led to the creation of a powerful navy to discourage both pirates and rival nations. They had inherited their naval strength and experience from their forebears, the Phoenicians, but had increased it because, unlike the Phoenicians, the Punics did not want to rely on a foreign nation's aid. This, coupled with its success and growing hegemony, brought Carthage into increasing conflict with the Greeks, the other major power contending for control of the central Mediterranean.

The Greeks, like the Phoenicians, were expert sailors who had established thriving colonies throughout the Mediterranean. These two rivals fought their wars on the island of Sicily, which lay close to Carthage. From their earliest days, both the Greeks and Phoenicians had been attracted to the large island, establishing a large number of colonies and trading posts along its coasts. Small battles had been fought between these settlements for centuries.

No Carthaginian records of the war exist today because when the city was destroyed in 146 BC by the Romans, the books from Carthage's library were distributed among the nearby African tribes. None remain on the topic of Carthaginian history. As a result, most of what is known about the Sicilian Wars comes from Greek historians.

== Background ==
The Phoenicians had established trading posts all over the coast of Sicily after 900 BC, but had never penetrated far inland. They had traded with the Elymians, Sicani and Sicels and had ultimately withdrawn without resistance to Motya, Panormus and Soluntum in the western part of the island when the Greek colonists arrived after 750 BC. These Phoenician cities remained independent until becoming part of the Carthaginian hegemony some time after 540 BC.

=== Carthaginian hegemony ===
Carthage created its hegemony in part to resist Greek encroachments in the established Phoenician sphere of influence. Phoenicians initially (750–650 BC) did not choose to compete with the Greek colonists, but after the Greeks had reached Iberia sometime after 638 BC, Carthage emerged as the leader of Phoenician imperialism. During the 6th century BC, mostly under the leadership of the Magonid dynasty, Carthage established an empire which would commercially dominate the western Mediterranean until the 2nd century BC. The Phoenicians in Sicily and the Elymians had united to defeat the Greeks of Selinus and Rhodes near Lilybaeum in 580 BC, the first such recorded incident in Sicily. The next known Greek incursion took place 70 years later.

=== Greek settlement ===
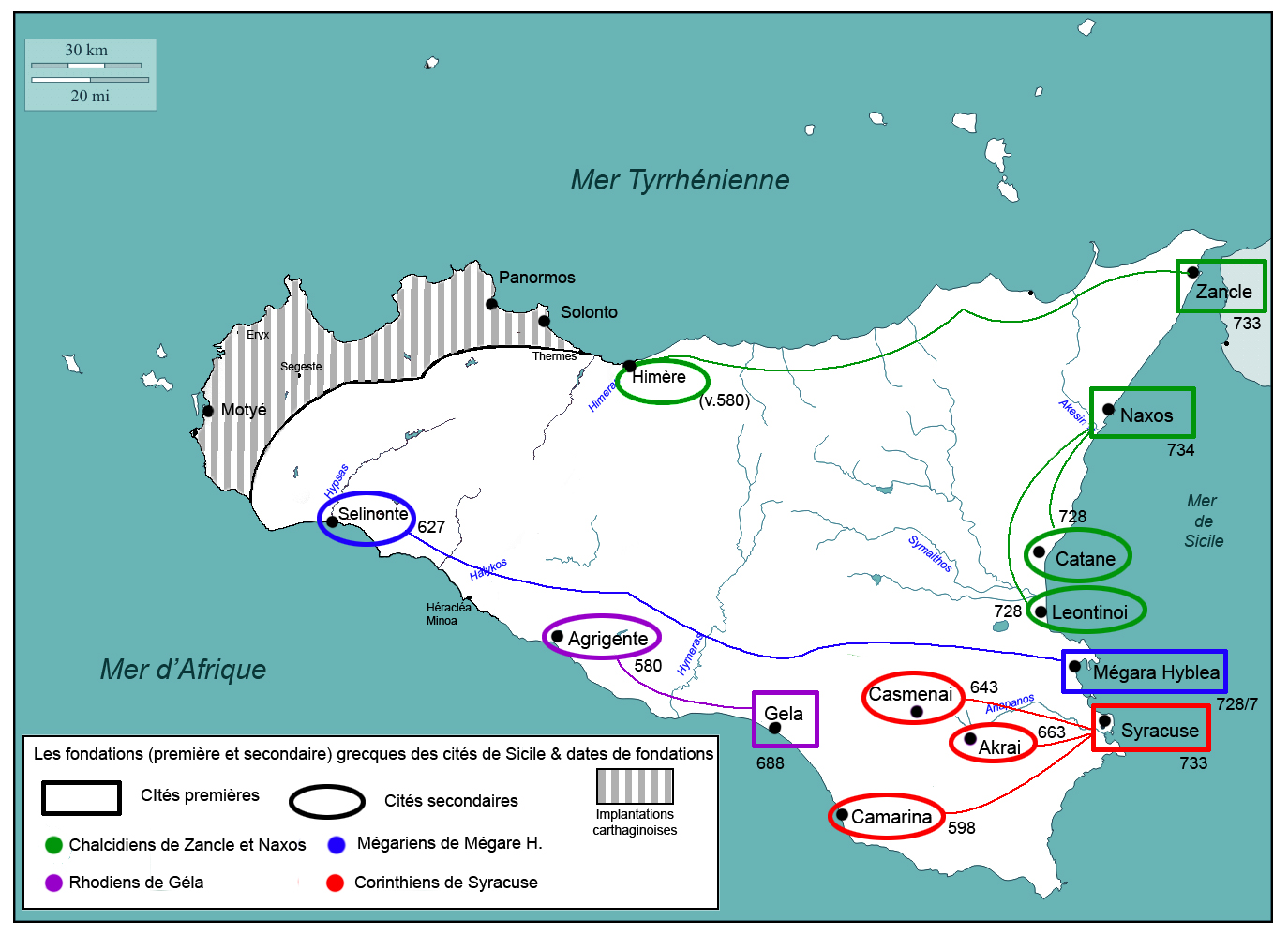
First Greek settlements & dates

The Greek-colonized zone encompassing Sicily and southern Italy came to be known as Magna Graecia. The Greeks living in this area behaved pretty much like the mainland Greeks, expanding their political and commercial domain at the expense of their neighbours while keeping the feud between the Ionians and the Dorians alive. In Sicily, the Ionian Greeks on the whole had friendly relations with native Sicilians and the Phoenicians, but the Dorian Greek colonies were comparatively more aggressive, expanding inland from the coast at the expense of the natives to expand their domain. Conflicts among the Greek colonies and between the natives and Greeks had erupted, but these were mostly localized affairs. Trade also flourished between the natives, the Greeks and the Phoenicians, and the Greek colonies became prosperous. This prosperity enabled some of the Greek cities to start to expand their territories again, ultimately leading to the events known as the First Sicilian War.

==== Carthage joins the fight ====
The Carthaginian Malchus is said to have "conquered all Sicily" and sent captured booty to Tyre some time after 540 BC, which probably meant that Motya, Panormus and Soluntum had fallen under Carthaginian control. The growth of Selinus and Himera during this period indicates the Carthaginians and Greeks did not confront one another at this time. Thirty years later, Prince Dorieus, having lost the Spartan throne, showed up to colonize Eryx – after being expelled from Libya by Carthage and the Macae in 511 BC, following a three-year struggle.

Carthage aided Segesta to defeat the expedition of Dorieus in 510 BC. The surviving members of Dorieus' expedition then founded Heraclea Minoa. Sicilian Greeks (probably the cities of Akragas, Gela and Selinus) fought an undated war of revenge against Carthage, which led to the destruction of Minoa and a treaty which brought economic benefits for the Greeks. An appeal for aid to avenge the death of Dorieus was ignored by mainland Greece, even by the brother of Dorieus Leonidas of Sparta, famous for his role at Thermopylae in 480 BC. This episode possibly demonstrated the futility of opposing Carthage by single Greek cities or the unreliability of aid from mainland Greece, a situation that would change with the rise of the Greek tyrants in Sicily. Two Greeks from Gela, Cleander and Gelo, had been involved in this war and they would become the catalysts of the events that followed.

=== Sicilian Greek tyrants ===
While the events in western Sicily played out and Carthage remained engaged in Sardinia, most of the Greek colonies in Sicily fell under the rule of tyrants. The tyrants of Gela, Akragas and Rhegion, expanded their respective dominions at the expense of native Sicilians and other Greek cities between 505 and 480 BC, with the Dorian city of Gela being the most successful.

==== Dorian Greeks become dominant in Sicily ====
Cleander of Gela (505-498 BC) and his brother Hippocrates (498-491) took over both Ionian and Dorian Greek territory, and by 490 BC, Zankle, Leontini, Catana, Naxos, besides neighbouring Sicel lands and Camarina had fallen under Gelan control. Gelo, successor of Hippocrates, captured Syracuse in 485 BC and made the city his capital. By using ethnic cleansing, deportation and enslavement, Gelo transformed the former Ionian cities into Dorian ones and made Syracuse the dominant power in Sicily. Meanwhile, Akragas had taken over Sikan and Sicel lands under the tyrant Theron of Acragas (488-472 BC). To forestall any conflicts between Akragas and Syracuse, Gelo and Theron married into each other's families, creating a united front against the Sicels and Ionian Greeks of Sicily. The major part of the resources and manpower of Greek Sicily was thus concentrated in the hands of these two aggressive tyrants, a threat to all other Sicilian powers.

==== Ionian Greeks call on Carthage ====
To counter this Doric threat, Anaxilas of Rhegion from Italy, who had captured Zankle from Gelo in 490 BC, allied himself with Terrilus, the tyrant of Himera, and married his daughter. Himera and Rhegion next became allies of Carthage, the nearest foreign power strong enough to provide support. Selinunte, a Doric city whose territory bordered Theron's domain, also became a Carthaginian ally – perhaps the fear of Theron and the destruction of Megara Hyblaea (mother city of Selinus) by Gelo in 483 BC, had played a part in this decision. Thus, three blocs of power were delicately balanced in Sicily by 483 BC – Ionians dominating the north, Carthage the west, Dorians the east and south. The Sicels and Sikans, sandwiched in the middle, remained passive, but the Elymians joined the Carthaginian alliance.

== First Sicilian War (480 BC) ==
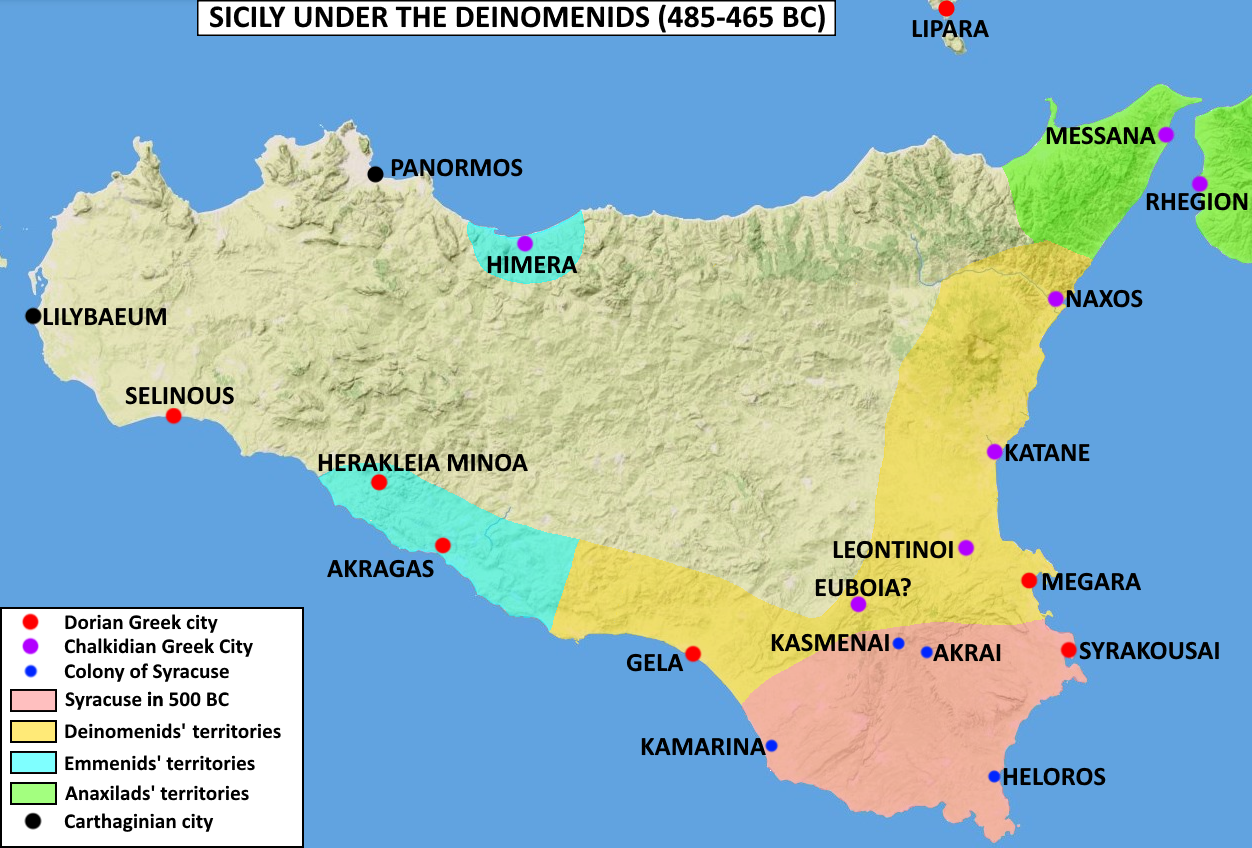
Sicily under the Deinomenids (485-465 BC)

Carthage responded to the call for aid by Terrilus, tyrant of Himera, after Theron deposed him in 483 BC to set up an expedition to Sicily. Carthage could not ignore this imminent threat because the Gelo-Theron alliance was about to take over the whole of Sicily, and Hamilcar was a guest friend of Terrilus.

Carthage may have also chosen this time to attack because a Persian fleet attacked mainland Greece in the same year. The theory that there was an alliance with Persia is disputed, because Carthage neither liked foreign involvement in their wars, nor wanted to contribute to foreign wars, unless they had strong reasons to do so. But because control of Sicily was a valuable prize for Carthage and because Carthage fielded its largest military force to date, under the leadership of the general Hamilcar, Carthage was eager for war. Traditional accounts give Hamilcar's army a strength of 300,000 men; this number seems unlikely because, even at its peak, the Carthaginian Empire would have only been able to muster a force of about 50,000 to 100,000 men. To achieve this number Hamilcar would have needed to call upon the other Phoenician cities in the eastern Mediterranean. If Carthage had allied with Persia, they might have supplied Carthage mercenaries and aid, which the Persians undoubtedly had, but there is no evidence to support this cooperation between the Carthaginians and the Persians.

En route to Sicily, the Punic fleet suffered losses, possibly severe, due to poor weather. After landing at Ziz, the Punic name for Panormus, modern-day Palermo, Hamilcar was then decisively defeated by Gelo at the Battle of Himera, which was said to have occurred on the same day as the Battle of Salamis.

Hamilcar was either killed during the battle or committed suicide in shame. The loss caused changes in the political and economic landscape of Carthage, the old government of entrenched nobility was ousted, replaced by the Carthaginian Republic. The king still remained, but he had very little power and most power was entrusted to the Council of Elders. Carthage paid 2,000 talents as reparations to the Greeks, and did not intervene in Sicily for 70 years.

In Sicily, Carthage lost no territory and the Greeks gained none. Syracuse did not attack Rhegion or Selinus, allies of Carthage. The booty from the war helped to fund a public building program in Sicily, Greek culture flourishing as a result. Trading activity saw the prosperity of the Greek cities increase and the wealth of Akragas began to rival that of Sybaris. Gelo died in 478 BC and, within the next 20 years, the Greek tyrants were overthrown and the Syracuse-Akragas alliance fragmented into 11 feuding commonwealths under oligarchs and democracies. Their bickering and future expansionist policies led to the Second Sicilian war.

== Second Sicilian War (410–404 BC) ==
Sicily at the 2nd battle of Himera 409 BC

While the Greek cities in Sicily bickered and prospered for 70 years after Himera, Carthage had conquered the northern fertile half of modern-day Tunisia, and strengthened and founded new colonies in North Africa, such as Leptis and Oea, modern Tripoli. Carthage had also sponsored the journey of Mago Barca (not to be confused with Mago Barca, Hannibal Barca's brother) across the Sahara Desert to Cyrenaica, and Hanno the Navigator's journey down the African coast. The Iberian colonies had seceded in that year with the help of the Iberians, cutting off Carthage's major supply of silver and copper.

In Sicily, Dorian-Greek Selinus and Ionian-Greek (former Elymian) Segesta renewed their rivalry. Selinus encroached on Segestan land and defeated their forces in 416 BC. Carthage turned down a Segestan plea for help from outside powers, but Athens responded by deploying a military expedition to the island, commanded by the prominent general Alcibiades. However, the subsequent Sicilian Expedition was destroyed in 413 BC by the joint effort of the Sicilian cities with Spartan aid. Selinus again defeated Segesta in 411 BC. This time Segesta submitted to Carthage, and a Carthaginian relief force sent by Hannibal Mago helped Segesta defeat Selinus in 410 BC. Carthage sought to end the matter diplomatically while assembling a larger force.

After a round of diplomacy involving Carthage, Segesta, Selinus and Syracuse failed to bring about a reconciliation between Segesta and Selinus, Hannibal Mago set out for Sicily with a larger force. He succeeded in capturing Selinus after winning the Battle of Selinus, then destroyed Himera after winning the Second Battle of Himera despite Syracusan intervention. Hannibal did not press on to attack Akragas or Syracuse, but returned triumphantly to Carthage with the spoils of war in 409 BC.

While Syracuse and Akragas, the strongest and richest cities of Sicily, took no action against Carthage, the renegade Syracusan general Hermocrates raised a small army and raided Punic territory from his base at Selinus. He managed to defeat the forces of Motya and Panormus before losing his life in a coup attempt in Syracuse. In retaliation Hannibal Mago led a second Carthaginian expedition in 406 BC.

This time the Carthaginians met with fierce resistance and ill-fortune. During the Siege of Akragas (which is mentioned in the Carthaginian Agrigentum inscription) the Carthaginian forces were ravaged by plague, and Hannibal Mago himself succumbed to it. Himilco II, his successor, captured and sacked Akragas, then captured the city of Gela, sacked Camarina and repeatedly defeated the army of Dionysius I, the new tyrant of Syracuse. The plague struck the Carthaginian army again, and Himilco agreed to a peace treaty that left the Carthaginians in control of all the recent conquests, with Selinus, Thermae, Akragas, Gela and Camarina as tributary vassals. Carthaginian power was at its peak in Sicily.

== Third Sicilian War (398–393 BC) ==
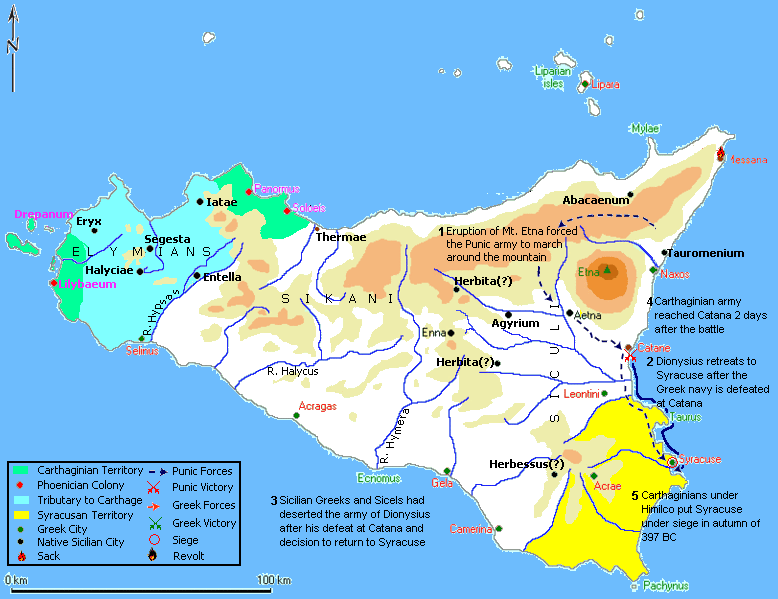
Punic siege of Syracuse in 397 BC

By 398 BC, Dionysius had consolidated his strength and broke the peace treaty, commencing the Siege of Motya and capturing the city. Himilco responded decisively, leading an expedition which not only reclaimed Motya, but also captured Messina.

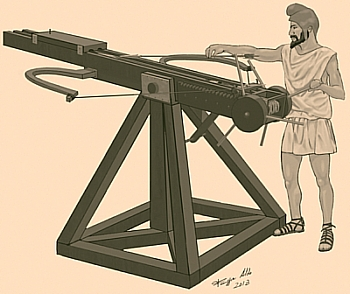
Ancient catapult used in the siege of Motya

Finally, he laid siege to Syracuse itself after decisively defeating the Greeks in the naval Battle of Catana. The siege met with great success throughout 397 BC, but in 396 BC plague again ravaged the Carthaginian forces, and they collapsed. Carthage lost her new Greek conquests but retained control over the western territories and the Elymians. No treaty was signed between the belligerents to signal the end of the war.

Dionysius soon rebuilt his power and sacked Soluntum in 396 BC. He was engaged in eastern Sicily during 396-393 BC, including the Siege of Tauromenium (394 BC). At this time, Carthage was occupied in Africa dealing with a rebellion. In 393 BC, Mago II, successor of Himilco, led an attack on Messina, but was defeated near Abacaenum by Dionysius. Reinforced by Carthage, Mago led another expedition through central Sicily, but ran into trouble near the River Chrysas. Dionysius also faced difficulties of his own, and a peace treaty was concluded that basically ensured Carthage and Syracuse left each other alone in their respective spheres of influence.

== Fourth Sicilian War (383–376 BC) ==
Dionysius opened hostilities again in 383 BC. Mago II allied with the Italiot league led by Taras and landed in force at Bruttium, forcing Syracuse into a two front war. Details of the first four years of campaigns are sketchy, but in 378 BC Dionysius defeated the Carthaginians in Sicily in the Battle of Cabala, with Mago falling in the battle. Carthage, also faced with rebellions in Africa and Sardinia, sued for peace. Dionysius asked Carthage to evacuate all Sicily, so war was again renewed and Mago III, son of Mago II, destroyed the Syracusan army at the Battle of Cronium in 376 BC. The subsequent peace treaty forced Dionysius to pay 1000 talents as reparations and left Carthage in control of Western Sicily.

== Fifth Sicilian War (368-367 BC) ==
Dionysius again attacked Punic possessions in 368 BC, and laid siege to Lilybaeum. The defeat of his fleet was a severe setback. After his death in 367 BC, his son Dionysius II made peace with Carthage, and Carthage retained her Sicilian possessions west of the Halycas and Himera rivers.

== Sixth Sicilian War (345–339 BC) ==
Carthage became embroiled in Syracusan politics in 345 BC, and her forces managed to enter the city at the invitation of one of the political contenders. The commander Mago bungled the affair, retreated to Africa and killed himself to escape punishment. Timoleon assumed power in Syracuse in 343 BC and started raiding Carthaginian possessions in Sicily. The Carthaginian expedition to Sicily was destroyed in the Battle of the Crimissus in 339 BC. The following peace treaty left Carthage in control of territories west of the Halycas river.

== Seventh Sicilian War (311–306 BC) ==
In 315 BC Agathocles, the tyrant of Syracuse, seized the city of Messana, present-day Messina. In 311 BC, he invaded the last Carthaginian holdings on Sicily, which broke the terms of the current peace treaty, and he laid siege to Akragas. Hamilcar, son of Gisco, successfully led the Carthaginian counterattack. He defeated Agathocles in the Battle of the Himera River in 311 BC. Agathocles had to retreat to Syracuse while Hamilcar won control over the rest of Sicily. In the same year, he laid siege to Syracuse itself.

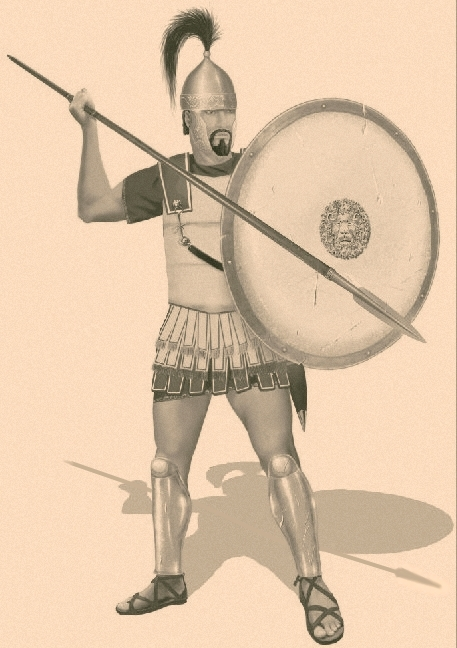
Carthaginian hoplite (4th century BC)

In desperation, Agathocles secretly led an expedition of 14,000 men to the mainland of Africa, hoping to save his rule by leading a counterstrike against Carthage itself. In this, he was successful: Carthage was forced to recall Hamilcar and most of his army from Sicily to face the new and unexpected threat. The two armies met in the first Battle of White Tunis outside Carthage. The Carthaginian army, under Hanno and Hamilcar, was defeated. Agathocles and his forces laid siege to Carthage, but it was too strongly fortified for them to assault. Instead, the Greeks slowly occupied the whole of northern Tunisia until they were defeated two years later in 307 BC. Agathocles himself escaped back to Sicily and negotiated a peace treaty with the Carthaginians in 306, in which Agathocles retained control of the eastern half of the island.

== Pyrrhic War (278–276 BC) ==
Sicily in 264-262BC

After Agathocles sued for peace, Carthage enjoyed a brief, unchallenged period of control of Sicily, which ended with the Pyrrhic War. The Sicilian Pyrrhic expedition, the second phase of the Pyrrhic War (280-265 BC), which ultimately led to the Punic Wars, can be considered the ultimate part of the Greek-Punic wars. Pyrrhus of Epirus arrived in Sicily to rescue the island from the Carthaginians. He conquered Palermo, Eryx and Iaitias but his siege of Lilybaeum failed. So he returned to Italy.

== Roman involvement ==
Rome, despite its close proximity to Sicily, was not involved in the Sicilian Wars of the 5th and 4th centuries BC because of its focus on local conflicts in Latium during the 5th century BC and its conquest of Italy proper during the 4th century BC.

Rome's later involvement in Sicily ended the indecisive warfare amongst great world powers on the island, but only after the nearly quarter-century long First Punic War (264 BC to 241 BC) between Rome and Carthage, arguably the largest known naval engagement in world history off Cape Ecnomus, the near-bankruptcy of both Carthage and Rome, and a loss of life estimated in excess one million.

So great was the loss of life that the Roman adult male population declined by 17% (per Roman census data, Polybius, and others). Because Carthage always employed largely mercenary soldiers, no similar population impact is noted, but the loss of Sicily after having spent centuries and sums untold fighting Greeks for control of the island was catastrophic.
