= Siege of Segesta (397 BC) =

Siege during the Sicilian Wars

Siege of Segesta (398 BC)
- Part of The Sicilian Wars
Date	Summer, 398 BC – spring 397 BC
Location	Segesta, Sicily
Result	Carthaginian victory

Belligerents
Syracuse; Sicilian Greeks	Segesta, Carthage

Commanders and leaders
Dionysius I of Syracuse	Unknown, Himilco II

Strength
80,000 foot and 3,000 horse	50,000 from Carthage

Casualties and losses
Unknown	Unknown

The siege of Segesta took place either in the summer of 398 BC or the spring of 397 BC. Dionysius the Elder, tyrant of Syracuse, after securing peace with Carthage in 405 BC, had steadily increased his military power and tightened his grip on Syracuse. He had fortified Syracuse against sieges and had created a large army of mercenaries and a large fleet, in addition to employing catapults and quinqueremes for the first time in history. In 398 BC he attacked and sacked the Phoenician city of Motya despite a Carthaginian relief effort led by Himilco II of Carthage. While Motya was under siege, Dionysius besieged and assaulted Segesta unsuccessfully. Following the sack of Motya, Segesta again came under siege by Greek forces, but the Elymian forces based in Segesta managed to inflict damage on the Greek camp in a daring night assault. When Himilco of Carthage arrived in Sicily with the Carthaginian army in the spring of 397 BC, Dionysius withdrew to Syracuse. The failure of Dionysius to secure a base in western Sicily meant the main events of the Second Sicilian war would be acted out mostly in eastern Sicily, sparing the Elymian and Phoenician cities the ravages of war until 368 BC.

== Background ==
The Elymians claimed to be refugees from Troy and they inhabited parts of north-western Sicily by 1100 BC, Segesta, Eryx and Entella being their main cities. The Elymian territory had several navigable rivers and was generally hilly, they were not seafarers and on the whole friendly with the Phoenician colonies of Motya, Panormus and Solus which bordered their domain. In some ways the Second Sicilian war stemmed from the refusal of the Elymians to accept Greek incursions and colonization attempts the same way the Sikans and Sicels had in Sicily.

=== Meddling Greeks and Punics ===
Greek colonization of Sicily started with the founding of Naxos in 735 BC, and they planted several colonies along the coast of Sicily by driving away, subjugating or allying with the neighboring Sicel and Sikan communities, and with the establishment of Himera in 648 BC and Selinus in 628 BC the Greeks reached the border of Elymian and Phoenician territory in Sicily. Himera, an Ionian Greek city, started no wars with the nearby Phoenicians, Elymians and Sicels, but Doric Selinus soon came to blows with her neighbors. With the founding of Akragas in 580 BC, Selinute territory was boxed in between Heraclea Minoa and Mazara, and to expand, Selinus had to either attack the Elymians in the north, the Phoenicians to the west of Selinus or Akragas in the east. A war between Selinus and Elymians was raging in 580 BC when Pentathlos of Knidos tried to colonize Lilybaeum, from where the Greeks could block the harbor of Motya and threaten Phoenician commerce. The Phoenicians joined the Elymians to defeat the Greeks and kill Pentathlos. The survivors moved to Lipara and became a threat for the Etruscans. Malchus of Carthage brought the Phoenician colonies under Carthaginian control around 540 BC, and "conquered most of Sicily", but it is unknown if he had fought the Elymians or the Greeks in Sicily during his time in Sicily. Selinus probably had conflicts with Carthage and was defeated around that time, resulting in a pro Carthaginian despot named Theron become tyrant, and sparing western Sicily from major warfare for the next 30 years.

In 510 BC, Dorieus of Sparta tried to colonize Eryx, Elmyans and Carthaginians joined hands to defeat that attempt, but the pro Carthaginian tyrant of Selinus was deposed by the surviving Spartans and Akragas took over Hereclea Minoa by 500 BC. The Elymians joined Carthage against Greeks in a war that destroyed Minoa after 510 BC. The rise of Gelo in Syracuse and Theron in Akragas divided Sicily into 3 power blocks by 480 BC, Carthage, allied with Elymians, and Selinus controlled the west, Carthaginian allies in Himera and Rhegion controlled the north, while Syracuse and Akragas dominated the east and south. The Elymians took no part in the first battle of Himera, where Syracuse and Akragas combined to defeat a Carthaginian expedition. Theron of Akragas may also have then attacked Motya, but Carthage lost no Sicilian territory after making peace with the Greeks, while Selinus and Rhegion also came to terms with Gelo. Syracuse remained dominant in Sicilian affairs until 466 BC while Carthage stayed away for the next 70 years.

=== Fortunate reprieve: bickering Greeks ===
For the next 50 years Elymians and Phoenicians were spared serious Greek aggression because of Greek infighting in Sicily. Theron of Akragas and Hieron of Syracuse, Gelo's brother and successor nearly went to war in 476 BC, Gela split from Hieron's empire in 476 BC under his brother Polyzelos, Theron slaughtered Ionian Greeks of Himera while putting down a rebellion and settled Dorian Greeks there in 476 BC. Akragas and Syracuse fought a war in 472 BC, resulting in the destruction of Theron's empire, Hieron of Syracuse died in 467 BC, and soon Greek Sicily, where the tyrants of Akragas, Rhegion and Syracuse had controlled all the Greek cities except Selinus since 480 BC, split into 11 feuding entities under democracies and oligarchies by 461 BC. Carthage had not been invited to this party and probably saw no reason to gatecrash their way in.

=== Growth of Segesta: 480 – 450 BC ===
Segesta was untouched by these events, while increased trading contacts with the Greek cities after 480 BC increased their economic prosperity. The Elymian territory was hemmed in by the Phoenicians to the north and west and the Greeks in the south, so the Elymians needed a delicate balancing act to ensure no conflicts arose with their more powerful neighbors. Segesta became the de facto political center of the Elymians, making treaties on their behalf and most Elymian cities began following Segesta in foreign policy matters. Segesta had little trouble with the Greeks after 480 BC and reached the peak of her powers between 480– 430 BC, apparently aided by Carthaginian inaction in Sicily, relative Selinute inactivity and the fragmentation of large Greek powers. The Elyminas except those of Eryx began to become more Hellenized during this period, and increased prosperity probably enabled the building of their famous Doric temple around 430 BC. Elymians also began to muscle in on their adjacent territory after 480 BC, Segesta fought a war involving Motya, Selinus and Akragas around 454 BC, and retained enough local clout to command Phoenician, Greek and other Elymian cities to bring in gold to fool the Athenians in 418 BC.

While the Sicilian Greeks brawled among themselves, Athens had created an empire in the guise of the Delian League and was seeking to intervene in Sicily, where Dorian Greek cities, potential allies of Athenian rival Sparta, were becoming dominant. The war of 454 BC probably exposed Elymian weakness as a military power causing Segesta to unsuccessfully appeal to Athens for aid.

=== Sicilian Greek revival and Elymian decline ===
The Segestan appeal had come at a time when Sicilian Greek cities had become politically stable and increased prosperity (partly from overseas trade) enabled some to finance territorial expansion efforts. Syracuse had sent two plundering expeditions against the Etruscans which may have temporarily disrupted Etruscan control over Corsica and Elba in 454 BC. Ducetius had begun uniting the Sicels against the Greeks after 459 BC and Sicel conflicts had kept Syracuse and Akragas occupied until 440 BC. Syracuse and Akragas fought a brief war in 445 BC, Sicilian cities became split in their support and defeated Akragas ultimately came to terms. Syracuse began massive military preparations in 439 BC by building 100 triremes, doubling their cavalry and reordering the infantry, with the probable aim to conquer all Sicily which may have caused other Sicilian Greek cities to look to Athens for support while taking defensive measures, but the Elymians were either unwilling or unable to do likewise.

While Athens had not acted on the Segestan appeal in 454 BC, but, as part of her interests in western Mediterranean Athenians helped found Thurii in Italy in 443 BC, and had made alliances with the Ionian Greek cities of Rhegion and Leontini in 433 BC. Euktemon, an Athenian citizen from Amphipolis had devised a Peripolus on western Mediterranean, and Athenian politicians had discussed possible action against Carthage. After the Peloponesian War started in 431 BC, Sparta and Corinth, enemies of Athens, asked the Dorian Greek cities of Magna Greacia to make ready 500 warships, although none had been sent to mainland Greece by 427 BC. This gave an added incentive for the Athenian to try to intervene in Sicily and set in motion events that eventually led to the Carthaginian intervention of 409 BC.

=== A chain reaction ===
Syracuse and Leontini stated a war in 427 BC, while Leontini was aided by Naxos, Catana, Camarina and Rhegion, Syracuse got support from Selinus, Messana and Locri, Akragas remained neutral. Athens sent a fleet to aid Leontini in 426 BC, which managed to capture Messana, signed a friendship treaty with the Sicels and Segesta, probably because Selinus and Himera were hostile to Athens. The Athenians ultimately failed to relieve Leontini and the war ended with the Congress of Gela in 424 BC, where Sicilian Greeks pledged not to accept outside interference in Sicilian matters. Political divisions between the aristocrats and commons at Leontini enabled Syracuse to occupy and garrison the city in 423 BC on behalf of the aristocrats, who became citizens of Syracuse while their opponents were driven out. Soon some of the Oligarchs joined the commons near Leontini and began warring against Syracuse.

=== Selinus mauls Segesta ===
Little is known of Sicilian affairs until 416 BC, when after a peace lasting almost 3 decades, Segestan power seems to have weakened. The Athenian alliance made the Elymians enemies of the Doric cities of Sicily, namely of Selinus and Syracuse. Greeks of Selinus opened hostilities in 416 BC by crossing the upper reaches of the River Mazaros, to occupy some disputed lands on the border of Segestan domain. Greeks began harassing Elymian lands, Segesta requested the Greeks to stop, and when this fail to stop the raids they managed to recapture the lands, but the Greeks defeated them in a later battle. Segesta then requested Akragas and Syracuse to intervene in vain, in fact Syracuse sent a fleet to blockade the Elymian coast. Segesta next requested Carthage to intervene, but the Carthaginians refused aid, and finally Segesta in desperation turned to Athens for help.

=== Athens roped in ===
Athens had recovered from the first phase of the Peloponnesian war and was involved in the second phase of the war when Segesta appealed for aid in the spring of 416 BC. Exiles from occupied Leontini and the Elymian ambassadors managed to convince the Athenians to send an expedition to Sicily, by stating that if Syracuse took over Sicily they could threaten Athens next, and Segesta would finance the Athenian forces sent to Sicily. The Athenians, after much deliberation, decided to send a fact finding mission tom Sicily to check out the wealth of Segesta which returned to Athens in the following spring and painted a fabulous picture of the riches of Segesta.

=== Elymians con Athenians ===
Segesta had sent 60 talents of silver, enough to keep 60 triremes afloat for a month to Athens, the temple at Eryx contained dazzling treasures, while all the Athenians were feasted to many dinners on plates of gold and silver throughout Segesta and other cities. Phoenicians and Carthaginians had the reputation of being Swindlers (probably because of their ability to trade cheap trinkets for silver and gold in Iberia and Africa, then use the wealth to buy Greek goods and built navies to keep the Greeks away from these markets). The Elymians probably had picked up a few tricks from their neighbors, because to impress to visiting Athenians of their wealth, they had used the same plates at different parties over and over again, fancy goods were collected from neighboring cities and shown off as the wealth of Segesta and Elymians to their Greek guests. The duped Athenians sent a force to Sicily to aid Segesta and Leontini in 415 BC, but the Athenians attacked Syracuse instead of Selinus and were wiped out after a prolonged struggle by 413 BC. Segesta became a marked enemy of Sicilian Greeks, and Selinus attacked and defeated Segesta in 411 BC.

=== Price of freedom: Punic vassal ===
Segesta now offered to become a Carthaginian vassal for protection against Greek aggression. Carthage accepted the offer, and Hannibal Mago led an expedition to Sicily that destroyed Selinus and wiped out Himera as well in 409 BC. Greek aggression against Punic territory led to a second invasion under Hannibal and Himilco II that saw the sack of Akragas in 406 BC, Greek abandonment and Carthaginian sack of Gela and Camarina in 405 BC and the establishment of Carthaginian control over most of Sicily and the confirmation of Dionysius as tyrant of Syracuse in 405 BC as a condition of peace. The Elymians became dependent allies of Carthage, paying for any Punic garrisons in their territory, and giving up their independent foreign policy but retaining control of internal affairs.

== Prelude: preparations of Dionysius ==
Between 405 BC and 397 BC, Dionysius took steps to increase the power of Syracuse, dealt with attempts to overthrow him and made Syracuse the best defended city in the whole Greek world. To counter Carthaginian expertise in siege warfare, Dionysius built a wall enclosing the whole Epipolae Platue, built forts to house troops and surrounded the whole city with walls. He also expanded the army by hiring mercenaries, increased the size of the Syracusan navy and built Quinqueremes for his fleet and Catapults to aid his siege operations, and made suits of armor and arms to equip soldiers at state expense. He also expanded Syracusan territory by attacking the Sicels and conquering the Greek cities of Naxos, Leontini and Catana. In 398 BC, Dionysius besieged Motya, starting a war with Carthage, and Segesta was caught in the middle again. Elymian power had further weakened by this time, as Entella had been taken over by a group of Campanian mercenaries (another group would take over Messina 115 years later and cause the Punic Wars between Rome and Carthage) who were loyal to Carthage but not to Segesta.

=== Dionysius commences hostilities ===
Carthaginian rule over Sicily had been harsh, and as Dionysius and his army marched west along the southern coast of Sicily, Greek cities under Carthaginian domain rebelled and along with Sikans, Sicels and the city of Messene sent contingents to join Dionysius, while only Panormus, Solus, Ancyrae, Segesta and Entella and Motya remained loyal to Carthage. By the time Dionysius reached Motya, contingents of Greeks, Sicels, and Sikans had augmented his forces to 83,000 souls, even Elymian Eryx joined the Greeks. Dionysius had ample manpower at his command to take on multiple tasks simultaneously, and he took advantage of it. He put his brother Leptines in charge of the siege of Motya, beached all his transport ships and part of his fleet and used their crews to build the siege works. Part of the army was left at Motya while Dionysius led the rest to plunder the Elymian and Punic territories in western Sicily. He then put Segesta and Entella under siege.

== Segesta under siege ==
There were several reasons for Dionysius to take a crack at Segesta, he had a large army and idle soldiers were often unruly, capture of Segesta would yield much booty and also might cow the other Elymian cities into submission. Logistics might have also influenced his decision, as there were no natural harbors in the southern coast of Sicily big enough to house the entire Greek fleet and it was easier to bring supplies by sea. Beaching ships to supply the army were dangerous as the enemy fleet might surprise and destroy it (Spartans captured most of the beached Athenian fleet at Aegospotami in 405 BC to win the Peloponnesian War and Carthaginians destroyed Dionysius' own transport fleet while they were beached at Motya in 398 BC and defeated the Greeks at Akragas by capturing their supply fleet). Capture of Segesta and Entella would have given Dionysius control of excellent defensive sites which could serve as supply bases for Dionysius, enabling him to stay and fight the Carthaginians in western Sicily. Dionysius was probably also testing the capability of his army at siege warfare prior to tackling his main objective: Motya.

=== Defenses of Segesta ===
A generic representation, not to exact scale, geographic features partially shown.

The city of Segesta is built around twin peaks of Mt. Barbaro, respectively 415 and 433 meters in height. The mountain itself sits in the middle of an elevated valley, while the deep gorges of River Pispina form a natural moat on three sides of the hill. The city itself was walled, parts of which is still visible today. The walls initially may have covered both peaks, but at a later date were rebuilt only around the city proper.

=== Greek forces ===
The mainstay of the Greek army was the Hoplite, drawn mainly from the citizens by Dionysius had a large number of mercenaries from Italy and Greece as well. Sicels and other native Sicilians also served in the army as hoplites and also supplied peltasts, and a number of Campanians, probably equipped like Samnite or Etruscan warriors, were present as well. The Phalanx was the standard fighting formation of the army. The cavalry was recruited from wealthier citizens and hired mercenaries. Dionysius probably had an army which was predominantly made of mercenaries, as Greek citizens liked short campaigns and were reluctant to fight during off season. Dionysius had mustered an army of 40,000 foot and 3,000 horsemen, from both citizens and mercenaries (at least 10,000, if not more) for attacking Motya in 398 BC, perhaps along with another 40,000 Greek, Sicel and Sikan volunteers. The actual number of soldiers at Segesta in unknown, as Dionysius had only part of his army with him.

=== Elymian warriors ===
Himilco had garrisoned the Punic and Elymian territories in 405 BC, it is unknown if Segesta had any Carthaginian soldiers present when Dionysius besieged the city. Large Sicilian cities like Syracuse and Akragas could field up to 10,000 – 20,000 citizens, while smaller ones like Himera and Messana between 3,000 – 6,000 soldiers. Segesta could probably field similar numbers, and probably augment their levy with allied contingents. Segestan cavalry probably was not as efficient as that of Selinus (probably for this reason Carthage equipped a cavalry force for them in 410 BC to fight Selinus). It is not known to what extent Greek cultural influenced the Elymian military equipment in 397 BC, probably Segestans also fielded a force of hoplites. In siege situations, women and old men could be used as impromptu peltasts.

== The siege of 398 BC ==
The Greek army probably encamped to the north of the city prior to attacking the city. Dionysius did try to starve the Elymians into submission; he assaulted the city several times. It is not known if the Greeks had employed siege towers, battering rams and catapults to assault the walls, or had simply tried to scale the walls using ladders. Whatever means the Greeks used to attack Segesta, they were all repulsed, likewise Entella withstood whatever the Greeks had thrown at them. Dionysius decided not to whittle away his strength in futile battles with Motya untaken, so he left enough soldiers to keep the Elymians from making mischief and marched back to Motya. He expected Segesta and the other cities still holding out for Carthage to fold once Motya had fallen. Dionysius managed to storm and sack Motya after foiling the Himilco led Carthaginian relief effort despite being trapped, and marched back to Syracuse during the winter. However, Greek detachments garrisoned Motya and remained in the vicinity of Segesta and Entella to maintain the blockade.

=== Spring 397 BC: Dionysius renews siege ===
Himilco led the army raised by Carthage, 50,000 men along with 400 triremes and 600 transports to Sicily in the spring of 397 BC and reached Panormus despite the efforts of Leptines to stop the Carthaginian armada.

However, Dionysius had already moved to western Sicily, and he had bullied the Sikans and Sicels on his way to Segesta, forcing the city of Halikyai to join the Greek side. He joined the Greek force at Segesta and put the city under blockade. Dionysius was a master of night attacks, he had conquered Motya through one and would lift the siege of Syracuse through another. However, Dionysius himself fell victim to an Elymian nighttime sally at Segesta. The Elymians managed to reach his camp undetected, and burn down most of the tents. Although few men had perished in the flames, all the cavalry horses were lost – a serious loss considering Himlico was about to reach Sicily with an army. Dionysius kept Segesta under blockade and continued ravaging the nearby lands.

Himilco did not immediately come to Segesta, after being joined by some Elymians and Sikans, he recaptured Eryx, then moved to Motya and captured the city and founded Lilybaeum. Dionysius now lifted the siege of Segesta and fell back. While Himilco marched for Segesta Dionysius pondered his options; his provisions were running low and he was on hostile territory, much of which had been ravaged. The Greeks were eager for battle and wanted to march against Himilco's army, but Dionysius probably had second thoughts. He was unsure if he had enough strength to win the coming battle, commanding a smaller army in 397 BC and was facing a superior Carthaginian force and did not wish to confront Himilco under unfavorable circumstances. Dionysius tried to entice the Sikans and Elymians to leave the area and enter his service unsuccessfully, and when Halikyai switched sides, Dionysius gave up on diplomacy and fell back to Syracuse.

== Aftermath ==
With the retreat of Dionysius, Carthaginians regained control over western Sicily, which Dionysius would not be able to eradicate during his lifetime. His failure to secure a base in western Sicily gave back the initiative to Himilco, who unsuccessfully besieged Syracuse after sacking Messina and defeating the Greek fleet at Catana, ensuring that western Sicily remain mostly free of the ravages of war. Segesta remained a dependent vassal of Carthage until the Punic Wars and was not touched by the wars between Carthage and Syracuse until 307 BC, when the city switched sides made common cause with Agathocles, tyrant of Syracuse, probably because of excessive Punic demands to meet their war expenses and the success of the Greeks in Africa and Sicily against Carthage. This backfired when Agathocles sacked the city after his demands were refused. Segesta again became part of the Carthaginian hegemony in 305 BC when Carthage and Syracuse agreed to terms. Segesta defected to Pyrrhus in 278 BC, was back in Punic hands by 275 BC and finally defected to Rome in 263 BC.

== Bibliography ==
- Baker, G. P. (1999). Hannibal. Cooper Square Press. ISBN 0-8154-1005-0.
- Warry, John (1993). Warfare in The Classical World. Salamander Books Ltd. ISBN 1-56619-463-6.
- Lancel, Serge (1997). Carthage A History. Blackwell Publishers. ISBN 1-57718-103-4.
- Bath, Tony (1992). Hannibal's Campaigns. Barns & Noble. ISBN 0-88029-817-0.
- Kern, Paul B. (1999). Ancient Siege Warfare. Indiana University Publishers. ISBN 0-253-33546-9.
- Church, Alfred J. (1886). Carthage, 4th Edition. T. Fisher Unwin.
- Freeman, Edward A. (1894). History of Sicily Vol. III. Oxford Press.
- Caven, Brian (1990). Dionysius I: War-Lord of Sicily. Yale University Press. ISBN 0-300-04507-7.
