= Sack of Camarina =

Carthaginian sack of Sicilian city of Camarina (405 BC)

Coordinates: 36.8721°N 14.4477°E

Sack of Camarina (405 BC)
- Part of the Second Sicilian War
Date	405 BC
Location	Camarina, Sicily
Result	Greek retreat; Camarina sacked
Territorial changes	Camarina was occupied by Cartago

Belligerents
Syracuse; Sicilian Greeks	Carthage

Commanders and leaders
Dionysius	Himilco II

Strength
30,000 infantry and 3,000 cavalry	40,000–50,000

Casualties and losses
Unknown	Unknown

The siege and subsequent sacking of Camarina took place in 405 BC during the Sicilian Wars.

The conflict began as a response to the offensive activities undertaken by Hermocrates of Syracuse against Carthaginian territories in Sicily, particularly Selinus, after 408 BC. In response, Carthage dispatched an army under the command of Hannibal Mago and Himilco II, members of the Magonid family, to Sicily. Once in Sicily, they found themselves facing a coalition of Greek Sicilian forces led by Syracuse. The encounter resulted in an extended siege lasting eight months.

The Greek forces were compelled to abandon Akragas in the winter of 406 BC due to the intensity of the siege. During this period, the Carthaginian command suffered a loss as Hannibal Mago succumbed to the plague. In the aftermath, the Carthaginians seized Akragas, and then used it as their winter base. They launched an assault on Gela in the spring of 405 BC. By this time, Dionysius I had assumed the role of the Supreme Commander of Syracuse. However, his army was defeated at Gela.

Despite relatively few Greek casualties, Dionysius ordered an evacuation of the city. The Carthaginians entered the vacated Gela the subsequent day. The Greek forces then withdrew to Camarina, accompanied by the displaced residents of Gela. Upon reaching Camarina, Dionysius made the controversial decision to order the inhabitants to abandon their city instead of preparing for a defensive stand.

After retreating to Syracuse, internal strife resulted in a faction of the Greek army seizing Syracuse. However, the city was later reclaimed by Dionysius. Meanwhile, the Carthaginians pillaged Camarina and encamped there during the summer. Eventually, a peace treaty was established which affirmed Carthaginian control over Selinus, Akragas, Gela, and Camarina. The Greeks were permitted to inhabit these cities under the new administration, while Dionysius was recognized as the ruler of Syracuse.

This event marked a significant point in the Sicilian Wars, with Carthage attaining peak control over Sicily, a level of dominance that wouldn't be seen again until after the demise of Agathocles in 289 BC.

== Background ==
Carthage had isolated itself from Sicilian affairs for almost 70 years, following the defeat at Himera in 480 BC, during which time Greek culture had started to penetrate the Elymian, Sikanian and Sicel cities in Sicily. However, in 411 BC when the Elymian city Segesta was defeated by the Dorian Greek city Selinus. Segesta appealed to Carthage for aid, and the Carthaginian Senate agreed to intervene on behalf of Segesta. Hannibal Mago of Carthage led an army which took the city of Selinus by storm in 409 BC and then also destroyed the city of Himera. Syracuse and Akragas, the leading Greek cities in Sicily did not confront Carthage at that time and the Carthaginian army withdrew with the spoils of war. For 3 years, no treaties were signed between the Greeks and Carthaginians to signal a closure of hostilities.

The Carthaginian Expedition of 406 BC, and the raids of the exiled Syracusan general Hermocrates on Punic territory around Motya and Panormus provoked Carthage into sending another army to Sicily in 406 BC under Hannibal Mago, who brought his cousin Himilco as his second in command. The leading Greek cities of Sicily, Syracuse and Akragas, had prepared for conflict by hiring mercenaries and expanding the fleet, along with keeping the city walls in good repair. Although Syracuse was involved in the Peloponnesian War and with disputes with her neighbours, their government sent an appeal for support to Magna Graecia and mainland Greece once the Carthaginians landed in Sicily.

=== Fall of Akragas ===
Hannibal besieged Akragas in the summer of 406 BC, which withstood the initial assault. While building siege ramps for future attacks the army was struck by plague and Hannibal along with thousands of Carthaginians perished. Part of the Carthaginian army under Himilco, Hannibal's kinsmen and deputy, was defeated by the Greek relief army led by Daphnaeus, and the city was temporarily relieved. The Akragans were not satisfied with the decision of the generals (who refrained from chasing the defeated Carthaginians), which resulted in 4 of them being stoned to death. The Greeks then halted supplies to the Carthaginian camp and causing panic within the Punic army. Himilco saved the situation by managing to defeat the Syracusan fleet and capturing the grain convoy bound for Akragas. The Greeks, faced with starvation, abandoned Akragas, which was sacked by Himilco. The siege had lasted for 7 months. After wintering at Akragas, Himilco moved on Gela. It is not known if the Carthaginians had received any reinforcement during the winter to make up their losses, but Himilco had left the Punic fleet at Motya, thus becoming dependent of a long supply line.

== Dionysius takes over Syracuse ==
While the Carthaginians wintered at Akragas, Akragan refugees made accusations against the Syracusan generals after reaching that city. In the assembly, Dionysius, who had fought bravely at Akragas, supported these accusations. Although he was fined for breaking meeting rules, his friend Philistos paid the fine, keeping him eligible for political office. The assembly then deposed Daphnaeus and the other generals and appointed replacements, Dionysius among them. The Akragan refugees left Syracuse after this and ultimately found shelter in Leontini. Gela requested Syracuse for aid, as the Carthaginians were approaching that city.

=== Power Politics ===
Dionysius started scheming to expand his power prior to sending help to Gela. He got the government to recall political exiles (former followers of Hermocrates like himself – and potential allies), and then marched to Gela with 2,000 foot and 400 horse, which was then under the command of the Spartan Dexippus. Dionysius dabbled in the political feud of Gela and managed to condemn their generals to death. He gave his soldier double pay from the confiscated property of the dead generals, then returned to Syracuse with the army, happened upon a gathering of citizens enjoying a play and as the people came to greet him, Dionysius promptly accused his fellow generals of taking bribes from Carthage. The Syracusan government deposed the others the following and made Dionysius sole commander. Dionysius then marched to Leontini, held a military assembly, and after some stage-managed theatrics, got the citizens present to give him a bodyguard of 600 men, which he eventually increased to 1,000 mercenaries. Then he sent Dexippus away and had Daphnaeus and other Syracusan generals executed. The tyranny of Dionysius (405 -367 BC) had begun. After securing his political base, Dionysius turned his attention to countering the Carthaginian threat to Gela which had managed to repulse the Carthaginians without outside help.

==== Gela abandoned ====
The political machinations of Dionysius had delayed aiding Gela, but once there Dionysius promptly took effective action. Encamping beside the mouth of River Gela, he kept harassing the Carthaginian supply lines for 3 weeks, but after his soldiers demanded direct action he devised a complex battle plan to lead a 3 pronged attack on the Carthaginian camp situated to the west of Gela. Clumsy coordination between the individual detachments of the Greek army caused a defeat in detail for its divisions instead of achieving a double envelopment of the Carthaginian force. At this moment Dionysius decided to evacuate Gela, although the Greek army was nearly intact despite the defeat and in high sprites. Leaving 2,000 light troops in Gela and keeping the camp fires burning, the people of Gela and the rest of the army fell back to Camarina.

== Camarina: Location and defences ==
The city of Camarina was located 112 km west from Syracuse, between the rivers Hipparis and Oanis. The city was built on the south bank of River Hipparis, was surrounded by a circuit wall, and had two harbours at the river mouth. The harbours were not big enough to accommodate a large fleet, and ships had to be beached on the shore. Founded by Syracuse in 598 BC, it rebelled against its mother city with the aid of Sicels and was sacked in 552 BC, becoming part of the Syracuse domain. Hippocrates conquered it in 492 BC, Gelo relocated its population to Syracuse in 484 BC. It was Resettled by Gela in 461 BC and it had allied with Leontini and Athens in 437 BC against Syracuse. It aided Syracuse during the Athenian Expedition. Camarina had sent soldiers to Akragas in 406 BC and to Gela in 405 BC.

Camarina was located on the south bank of the river, which also acted as a moat for the city. It was closer to Syracuse than Gela, so Greek supply lines would be shortened considerably, and Dionysius also could use the cities of Acrae and Kasmenae as supply depots in addition to using the fleet to bring in provisions. The land north of the river had contained marshes, which would have caused difficulty for the Carthaginians as they would have a hard time approaching the city directly or camping near the town, if the marshes had not been drained before 405 BC.

== Opposing Forces ==
Carthage had initially sent an army probably numbering 50,000 men along with 120 triremes to Sicily in 407 BC. The army had suffered casualties at Akragas and Gela, plus the plague had also diminished its ranks. It is not known if Carthage had reinforced Himilco or Sicilians had sent reinforcements, so he could have commanded and army numbering 30,000 – 40,000 souls. The Punic navy was stationed at Motya, far from the area of operation.

Dionysius had commanded an army of 30,000 foot and 1,000 horsemen at Gela along with 50 triremes. The losses at Gela were slight and the whole force had reached Camarina safely. Camarina had sent 500 hoplites, 600 light troops and 20 horse to Akragas in 406 BC, and cities like Camarina and Gela probably could muster between 3,000 – 6,000 soldiers. Volunteers from the Gelan refugees would have augmented the Greek numbers.

=== Carthaginian Cohorts ===
The Libyans supplied both heavy and light infantry and formed the most disciplined units of the army. The heavy infantry fought in close formation, armed with long spears and round shields, wearing helmets and linen cuirasses. The light Libyan infantry carried javelins and a small shield, same as Iberian light infantry. The Iberian infantry wore purple bordered white tunics and leather headgear. The Heavy infantry fought in a dense phalanx, armed with heavy throwing spears, long body shields and short thrusting swords. Campanian, Sardinian and Gallic infantry fought in their native gear, but often were equipped by Carthage. Sicels and other Sicilians were equipped like Greek Hoplites.

The Libyans, Carthaginian citizens and the Libyo-Phoenicians provided disciplined, well trained cavalry equipped with thrusting spears and round shields. Numidia provided superb light cavalry armed with bundles of javelins and riding without bridle or saddle. Iberians and Gauls also provided cavalry, which relied on the all out charge. Carthage at this time did not use elephants, but Libyans provided bulk of the heavy, four horse war chariots for Carthage, none were present with the army at Camarina. Carthaginian officer corps held overall command of the army, although many units may have fought under their chieftains.

=== Greek forces ===
The mainstay of the Greek army was the Hoplite, drawn mainly from the citizens, but Dionysius had a large number of mercenaries from Italy and Greece as well. Sicals and other native Sicilians also served in the army as hoplites and also supplied peltasts. The Phalanx was the standard fighting formation of the army. The cavalry was recruited from wealthier citizens and mercenaries.

== Evacuation of Camarina ==
Dionysius had ordered the evacuation of Gela after his defeat probably because he did not wish to take the Carthaginians on in a head on clash. Reasons included: he was outnumbered, the Greek soldiers had refused to continue the harassing tactics he was using against the Carthaginian foragers and supply ships, and getting besieged in Gela during the winter would cut him off from Syracuse, where his political position was secure but not solid, and might lead to his opponents moving to depose him. Dionysius ordered the evacuation of Camarina probably for the same reasons the moment his army reached the city. The whole population moved out, carrying whatever they could, and leaving behind the sick and the infirm, they began to trek towards Syracuse.

=== Dionysius: brilliant strategist or traitor? ===
The rapid surrender of two Greek cities without a fight was detrimental to the reputation of an aspiring war leader, even if it was based on sound military reasoning and correct political judgement. Pursued by the fear of Carthaginians, but not the Carthaginians themselves, the refugees from Gela and Camarina headed towards Syracuse. The suffering of women, old folk, and children on the road affected the mood of the soldiers escorting the throng, and rumours began to spread on the motives of Dionysius. The Greeks speculated that he was in league with Carthage because:

- Dionysius had abandoned two easily defendable cities without any compelling military reason. The army was intact and ready to fight, the fleet held command of the sea while there was no shortage of provisions at Gela or Camarina.
- Dionysius had been slow to come to Gela when that city first came under Carthaginian attack, and at the battle his most loyal soldiers, the mercenaries, did not suffer any loss while the other detachments were mauled.
- The Carthaginians were not coming after the refugees as they should have, and letting the opportunity to catch the Greeks off balance slip away probably because they had a deal with Dionysius.

The Greeks were convinced that Dionysius had made a secret pact with Carthage and intended to rule over Syracuse using the fear of Carthage as his cause and his mercenaries as his tool. As rumours to that effect spread among the Greek mass, many began to contemplate the removal of Dionysius from power by any means necessary.

==== Fragmentation of the Greek Army ====
The Italian Greeks were first to take action – they had suffered the most casualties at Gela and they left the army and marched off to Messina. The cavalry of Syracuse, made of noblemen and former oligarchs, considered assassinating Dionysius, but he was too well guarded by his mercenaries for them to find an opportunity. They also left the army, rode to Syracuse, gained admittance without suspicion, then plundered the house of Dionysius and abused his wife, and spread rumours that the Greeks had been defeated and Dionysius had fled. After securing the city, they shut the gates against all outsiders.

== Dilemma of Dionysius ==
Dionysius was now in a tight spot, caught between the hostile Carthaginians in the west and the rebels in the east who had occupied Syracuse, his political base and safe haven, and had the Carthaginians attacked they would probably have prevailed over the diminished Greek army. The speedy action of Dionysius, combined with Carthaginian inactivity and rebel incompetence, saved the day for him. Dionysius picked 100 horse and 600 foot from his mercenaries and left the refugees and marched to Syracuse. He reached the city in the dead of night. Finding the gates shut and refused admittance; he burnt down the gate by setting fire to heaps of reeds and then entered the city. The rebels had neglected to man the gates properly and had not organised the remaining citizens for battle. Only a small number of the rebels faced Dionysius in the Agora and were massacred. Some of the remaining rebels were captured and executed; some were exiled while many fled the city to gather at Inessa. The refugees reached Syracuse the following day, and the refugees from Gela and Camarina joined the Greeks of Akragas at Leontini, no longer willing to support Dionysius or live under his rule.

=== Dealing with Carthage ===
Dionysius had managed to secure Syracuse, but he was not out of danger. The Sicels were neutral, but the Greeks at Leontini were hostile while Carthaginians were approaching the city. Had Himilco managed to persuade the Sicels and the discontented Greeks to turn against Syracuse Dionysius might have faced turmoil in Syracuse itself. However, The Carthaginian army was in no hurry, Himilco approached Syracuse at a leisurely pace, encamped by the marshes and did nothing. This inactivity became politically embarrassing for Dionysius, as he had been elected warlord to fight the Carthaginians who now showed little interest in fighting. After some time Himilco sent a herald to dictate terms for peace, which was accepted by Dionysius.

== Peace of 405 BC ==
Reasons for signing the treaty instead of continuing the war are speculated as:

- Dionysius was indeed in communication with Himilco and agreed to a treaty favourable to Carthage in exchange for peace and recognition of his authority. This is highly probable based on the future events in the career of Dionysius, when he launched four wars against Carthage over 37 years and made treaties when the going got bad for him, allowing him time to prepare for the next war.
- The army of Himilco was struck by plague again. During the entire campaign, the army had lost more men to the plague than in battle. Himilco chose not to battle Syracuse in his weakened state and opted for the treaty which gave Carthage control over two-thirds of Sicily and isolated Syracuse.
- The goal for Carthage probably was not the conquest of Sicily but to stop the raiding of Punic lands by Greeks – raids by Hermocrates of Syracuse based in Selinus had prompted Carthage to launch the war in the first place. The treaty ensured that if Syracuse chose to renew aggression, it would have to invade Greek or Sicel lands before reaching Carthaginian territory – Carthage had gained “Strategic depth” in Sicily. The tribute from the subject Greek cities would also help maintain Carthaginian garrisons in Sicily – if Carthage chose to station any.
- Unlike the Roman Republic, which always fought to achieve a favourable outcome, with treaties seen as temporary interludes, the Carthaginians were mostly willing to negotiate and abide by treaties as long as their commercial infrastructure was intact. Carthage kept to the terms of the treaty after the Battle of Himera in 480 BC for 70 years. In 149 BC, Carthage continually submitted to the ever harsher demands of the Roman consuls until they demanded Carthaginians move to an inland location, ending their commercial activities. Only then did the Carthaginians renege on the treaty.

The terms of the treaty were:

- Carthage keeps full control on the Phoenician cities in Sicily. Elymian and Sikan cities are in Carthaginian “Sphere of Influence”.
- Greeks are allowed to return to Selinus, Akragas, Camarina and Gela. These cities, including the new city of Therma, would pay tribute to Carthage. Gela and Camarina were forbidden to repair their walls.
- The Sicals and Messene were to remain free of Carthaginian and Syracusan influence, as was Leontini. This isolated Syracuse from the rest of Sicily.
- Dionysius was confirmed as ruler of Syracuse.
- Both sides agreed to release prisoners and ships captured during the campaign.

== Aftermath ==
It is a matter of speculation whether or not Dionysius could have successfully defended Camarina in face of determined Carthaginian assault, but with the general distrust Sicilian Greeks held for him the peace of 405 BC might not have taken place. This would often prove to be his undoing, The Greeks would often desert him in his future wars against Carthage.

On the other hand, Himilco had succeeded in expanding Carthaginian control over Sicily to its largest extent. The Carthaginians left Sicily soon after the treaty was signed, while Greeks returned to repopulate Akragas, Camarina and Gela, but these cities never reached their former prominence and never again threatened the position of Syracuse – which would help Dionysius in his wars against Carthage and the Sicels. The question of whether Dionysius and Himilco had played a “Fixed Game" - Carthaginians were allowed to plunder the potential rivals of Syracuse in exchange for setting Dionysius in power - can only be speculated on in absence of Carthaginian records. The plague was carried back to Africa, where it ravaged Carthage and weakened her for some time to come. Himilco was elected as “king” by 398 BC. He would lead the Carthaginian response to the activities of Dionysius in 399 BC. Gela and Camarina never recovered, Akragas regained some semblance of her former power but not her status as the wealthiest city in Sicily. Carthaginian rule over the newly gained territories was harsh and caused them to rebel at the first opportunity.

Peace in Sicily was to last until 404 BC when Dionysius started a war against the Sicels. As Carthage took no action, Dionysius increased his power and domain in Sicily and finally in 398 BC launched a war against the Carthaginians by attacking Motya. Ironically, Carthage had helped keep Dionysius in power by providing him with Campanian mercenaries when the Syracusan rebels had him besieged in Syracuse. They would fall victim to repeated false promises of Dionysius over the next 37 years.

== Bibliography ==
- Baker, G. P. (1999). Hannibal. Cooper Square Press. ISBN 0-8154-1005-0.
- Freeman, Edward A. (1892). Sicily Phoenician, Greek & Roman, Third Edition. T. Fisher Unwin.
- Warry, John (1993). Warfare in The Classical World. Salamander Books Ltd. ISBN 1-56619-463-6.
- Lancel, Serge (1997). Carthage A History. Blackwell Publishers. ISBN 1-57718-103-4.
- Bath, Tony (1992). Hannibal's Campaigns. Barns & Noble. ISBN 0-88029-817-0.
- Kern, Paul B. (1999). Ancient Siege Warfare. Indiana University Publishers. ISBN 0-253-33546-9.
- Church, Alfred J. (1886). Carthage, 4th Edition. T. Fisher Unwin.
- Freeman, Edward A. (1894). History of Sicily Vol. III. Oxford Press.
- Caven, Brian (1990). Dionysius I: War-Lord of Sicily. Yale University Press. ISBN 0-300-04507-7.
