= Himilco (general) =

Magonid Carthaginian general (died 396 BC)

- Reign: 406 to 396 BC
- Predecessor: Hannibal Mago
- Successor: Mago II
- Died: 396 BC
- Dynasty: Magonids

Himilco (died 396 BC) was a member of the Magonids, a Carthaginian family of hereditary generals, and had command over the Carthaginian forces between 406 BC and 397 BC. He is chiefly known for his war in Sicily against Dionysius I of Syracuse.

Between 550 BC and 375 BC, the Magonid Family of Carthage played a central role in the political and military affairs of the Carthaginian Empire. Himilco came to prominence after being selected as deputy to his cousin Hannibal Mago in 406 BC for the Carthaginian expedition to Sicily. He took command of the expedition after Hannibal's death and sacked Akragas, Gela and Camarina while fighting off determined Greek opposition led by successive leaders of Syracuse.

The peace treaty Himilco concluded with Dionysius of Syracuse in 405 BC expanded Carthaginian holdings in Sicily to their maximum extent. Elected "king" around 398 BC, Himilco then led the Carthaginian effort against Dionysius from that date. Although initially successful, Himilco suffered a reverse at Syracuse in 396 BC when his forces were decimated by the plague and then defeated by Dionysius. He managed to bring the Carthaginian members of his army home after bribing Dionysius and abandoning his other troops. Himilco publicly assumed full responsibility for the debacle, and after visiting all the temples of the city dressed as a slave to offer penance, he is said to have starved himself to death.

== Early life ==
Nothing is known about the early life or family of Himilco. His family had been active in Carthaginian politics since 550 BC, expanding the empire in Sicily, Africa, Iberia and Sardinia during between 550 BC and 480 BC. The power of the position of "king" diminished after the defeat of his grandfather Hamilcar Mago at Himera in 480 BC with the rise of the council of Hundred and Four with the power to try and punish Carthaginian commanders. The Magonid family continued to be active in Carthaginian foreign affairs while Himilco was alive.

Himilco's father, probably Hanno, led a famous expedition down the west African coast to Cameroon, while his uncle, perhaps the famous Himilco the Navigator, had explored the western coast of Iberia, Gaul and may have reached England, seeking to tap into the tin trade with the Celts. Hanno, Himilco and their brother Gisco, along with Hannibal, Hasdrubal and Sappho (sons of Hasdrubal, the brother of Hamilcar Mago), also were active in expanding the Carthaginian domain in northern Africa and Sardinia and ending the payment of tribute to the Libyans. Gisco, however, had been exiled to Selinus, a Greek city on the south-western coast of Sicily, after the defeat at Himera. Hannibal Mago, son of Gisco, was the suffet of Carthage in 409 BC and led the expedition to Sicily which destroyed both Selinus and Himera and made Segesta a vassal entity. It is not known if Himilco had played a part in these activities, although the army had attracted a large number of Carthaginian citizens at that time. Hannibal Mago was elected "king" for his successes in Sicily.

== Deputy to Hannibal Mago ==
The Carthaginian Senate requested Hannibal Mago to command the Carthaginian expedition to Sicily in 406 BC to punish Hermocrates for raiding Carthaginian possessions around Motya and Panormus. Hannibal initially refused, pleading old age, but accepted when the Carthaginian Senate elected Himilco as his deputy. Hannibal led 60,000 soldiers and 1000 transports, escorted by 120 triremes to Sicily, where the cities of Akragas and Syracuse had gathered soldiers from Sicily and southern Italy to oppose the Carthaginians.

In the spring of 406 BC, Hannibal laid siege to Akragas, the wealthiest city in Sicily by "straddling" the city with 2 camps, while the Carthaginian fleet was based at Motya. The main Carthaginian army was in the western camp while the eastern one housed the Iberian and Campanian mercenaries. Akragas could field 10,000 hoplites and some cavalry and also had 1,500 crack mercenaries under the Spartan Dexippus in the city.

After the initial Carthaginian assault on the city gate nearest to the main Carthaginian camp with two siege towers failed, Hannibal then began to build siege ramps to assault the city from several directions. However, a plague swept through the Carthaginian army and Hannibal perished with many of his soldiers. Himilco was elected as the commander of the Carthaginian force. Because the Carthaginians had demolished tombs to get materials for the siege ramps, many of the Carthaginian soldiers believed that divine anger had caused the plague.

=== Appeasing the divine ===
Himilco's first challenge was to tackle the plague. Left unchecked, the plague would have decimated the Carthaginians, and if Himilco retreated, the Greeks might have carried the war into Carthaginian territories in Sicily. Himilco was in no position to force an advantageous truce – and defeated generals were often crucified in Carthage.

Himilco chose to sacrifice some animals to the sea and also sacrificed a child to a god Greeks associated with Cronos. It is not known if the Carthaginians had taken any practical measures to combat the plague, but the plague stopped. Himilco then resumed the ramp building and also dammed the Hypsas River to gain better access to the city. Before he could complete his siege of Akragas, Daphaenus of Syracuse arrived with 35,000 Sicilian soldiers along with Greek soldiers from the Italian mainland. Himilco kept a part of his army in the main camp to watch Akragas while the mercenaries marched east to fight the Greeks. Daphaenus defeated the mercenaries, drove the survivors to the main camp and occupied the eastern camp, thus lifting the siege. Himilco chose not to offer battle to the victorious Greeks, but he did not abandon his position either.

=== Starvation and mutiny ===
The Carthaginians were dependent of supplies brought overland from Western Sicily and through foraging. There were no natural harbours near Akragas to house a large supply fleet, while beached ships could be surprised and captured while ships remaining on the open seas could be destroyed by storms. Daphenaus began to harass the Carthaginians using peltasts and cavalry from Akragas and soon the Carthaginians faced a food shortage as less and less supplies got through. With morale falling, the mercenaries came close to mutiny as winter approached.

==== Managing men and fortune ====
Himilco temporarily placated the unruly mercenaries by bribing them with the gold and silver tableware of the Carthaginian officers. He still needed to improve his supply situation – and he seized on opportune information to achieve this. The Greeks were using grain ships escorted by 30 triremes to supply Akragas and their army, and had become lax due to the absence of Carthaginian ships in the vicinity. Just prior to the winter the Carthaginians managed to learn of the approach of one such convoy. Himilco then summoned 40 triremes from Motya and Panormus, which sailed up during the night and remained hidden from Greek scouts, then surprised the Greek flotilla at dawn. The Carthaginians sank 8 Greek triremes and captured the entire supply flotilla. The Carthaginians now had food to last for several months and their morale improved.

The Greeks now faced a problem – there was not enough food stocked at Akragas to feed both the population and the army until further supplies could be gathered – and organizing that would take time because of the winter season. Mistrust between Greeks from various quarters now burst open when this news became public – thus reducing their ability to take a joint decision regarding continuing the conflict. Himilco further aggravated the situation by bribing some Campanian mercenaries – who deserted to him. Rumours circulated that the Spartan general, Dexippus, leading 1,500 mercenaries, had also been bribed by Himilco. The tension now caused the Greek army to fall apart. Italian Greeks quit Akragas rather than face starvation, and soon other Greeks contingents along the whole population marched east to Gela. Himilco took possession of the city, which was sacked and the Carthaginian army wintered in the city.

== Siege of Gela and Sack of Camarina ==
In the following spring Himilco levelled Akragas and marched east to Gela. He did not surround the city with siege walls or "straddle" it by building several camps, but chose to encamp to the west of the city and capture the city through a direct assault. The Carthaginians duly attacked the west wall of Gela with battering rams but the Greeks beat back the attack and repaired the breaches in the walls during the night. Dionysius soon arrived with a relief force consisting of 30,000 infantry, 4,000 cavalry and 50 triremes and camped to the east of the city. Himilco chose to await developments in his camp and did not offer battle.

Following the script used at Akragas, Dionysius harassed Carthaginian supply columns for 3 weeks with light troops. Greek soldiers had other ideas and forced him to attack the Carthaginians. The Greeks then launched a three pronged attack on the Carthaginian camp. The imaginative battle plan, if implemented properly, might have trapped the Carthaginians but for the lack of coordination among Greek army units, which enabled the Carthaginians to defeat the Greeks. Dionysius then abandoned Gela and fell back to Camarina, and then left Camarina for Syracuse, while both the cities were sacked by Himilco's forces as the Carthaginians marched towards Syracuse.

Himilco did not press the pursuit but marched on Syracuse slowly. He thus missed an opportunity to destroy the forces loyal to Dionysius – because some Greek rebels had managed to seize Syracuse while the Greeks of Gela and Camarina had marched off to Leontini with the Italian Greeks. Dionysius was left adrift between the Carthaginian army and a hostile Syracuse, although he took speedy action and managed to recapture Syracuse. Himilco and the Carthaginians camped near Syracuse but made no attempt to besiege the city. After a few weeks Himilco sent a herald with a peace offer. It has been speculated that a plague had broken out in the Carthaginian camp, causing the Carthaginians to request a truce. During the whole campaign Himilco had lost more than half his army to the plague.

== Treaty of 405 BC ==
The treaty left Carthaginians supreme in Sicily with Syracuse isolated and Dionysius under suspicion of being a Carthaginian collaborator. The main conditions were:

- Carthage kept full control of the Phoenician cities in Sicily;
- Elymian and Sikan cities were to be in the Carthaginian "sphere of influence";
- the Greeks were allowed to return to Selinus, Akragas, Camarina and Gela. These cities, including the new city of Therma, would pay tribute to Carthage;
- Gela and Camarina were forbidden to repair their walls;
- the Sicels and Messina were to remain free of Carthaginian and Syracusan influence, as was Leontini. This effectively isolated Syracuse from the rest of Sicily;
- Dionysius was confirmed as ruler of Syracuse; and
- both sides agreed to release prisoners and ships captured during the campaign.

In return for recognizing Dionysius as the ruler of Syracuse, Himilco ensured the total reversal of all the conquests of Gelo and Hieron. Neutral powers now bordered the Syracusan domain, and the independence of these was guaranteed by both Carthage and Dionysius.

Gela, Camarina, Akragas and Himera had become tribute paying Carthaginian vassals, while the Sicanians and Elymians were part of the Carthaginian domain. Himilco had ensured Carthaginian rule was at its apex in Sicily, a position it would not again reach until 289 BC. Himilco garrisoned Western Sicily and disbanded the army.

== King of Carthage ==
Himilco was elected "king" between 405 BC and 398 BC, so he was in Carthage part of that time. It is not known if he had any part in ruling the Sicilian territories, where Carthaginian rule was deemed harsh on her new subjects. When Dionysius broke the peace treaty in 404 BC by attacking the Sicel city of Herbessus, Carthage, possibly weakened by the plague, did not respond. In 403 BC Carthage provided mercenaries to restore Dionysius to power after he was besieged in Syracuse by a coalition of Sicilian Greek cities led by Syracusan rebels.

Dionysius massively fortified the city of Syracuse between 400 BC and 398 BC and built up his forces, adding new weapons like the catapult and quinqueremes to his arsenal. In 398 BC he attacked the Carthaginian city of Motya, sparking off the first of four wars he would launch on Carthage. The Greeks and Sicilians rebelled and joined Dionysius, leaving only 5 cities (Panormus, Solus, Segesta, Entella and Ankyara) in Sicily loyal to Carthage. The Greeks besieged simultaneously Motya, Segesta and Entella in Sicily while Himilco began to mobilize Carthaginian forces.

== Siege of Motya ==
Without a standing army Himilco could not go to the aid of Motya immediately. While Carthage raised mercenaries and organized logistics, Himilco sent 10 triremes to attack Syracuse itself, hoping to draw off the Greeks from Motya. Although the Carthaginians sank whatever was afloat in the harbour of Syracuse, Dionysius did not withdraw his soldiers from Western Sicily. Himilco could not mount an assault on undefended Syracuse as he lacked soldiers.

Himilco next manned 100 triremes and sailed to Selinus in Sicily and then arrived at Motya the following day. The Greeks had beached their transports to the south of Motya and their warships to the north, while the crews were busy building siege works. The Carthaginians first burned all beached transports then sailed north, trapping the Greek ships in the shallow waters north of the island of Motya. Had Himilco attacked the beached Greeks warships he may have won a great victory. The Carthaginian ships were positioned superbly on the narrow mouth of the channel between the Island of Motya and the isthmus, so the Greeks would not be able to sail out with their whole fleet, and if they sailed out in small groups they would face difficulty in manoeuvring and reforming.

Himilco's stratagem failed because instead of trying to engage the Carthaginian fleet, Dionysius sent his catapult armed ships and land based catapults to engage the Carthaginians with missiles. While Himilco's crews suffered casualties, Dionysius had his men drag 80 triremes across the base of the isthmus to the north of Motya into the open sea beyond. These ships then sailed south so the Carthaginians in turn were almost trapped between the Greeks firing catapults and the triremes. The Carthaginians sailed back to Carthage, and Motya eventually fell after days of fierce street fighting.

== Sicilian Campaign 398 BC – 396 BC ==
After capturing Motya, Dionysius kept Segesta and Entella under siege, garrisoned Motya and withdrew to Syracuse, while his brother Leptines was posted at Eryx with 120 ships (triremes and quinqueremes). Himilco marshalled an army of 50,000 infantry, 4,000 cavalry and 400 chariots, while the Carthaginian navy mobilized 400 triremes and 600 transports. In term of number of warships this was the largest armada ever mobilized by Carthage. To keep any information from leaking to the Greeks, Himilco wrote down the armada's destinations in sealed letters, which were issued to his captains at the last moment. These letters were to be opened only if a storm caused the ships to become separated and lose sight of their flagship. The Carthaginian armada split into two groups: the transports headed straight for Panormus while the warships sailed north before turning east. Leptines managed to sink 50 transports (with 5,000 men and 200 chariots) but the rest of the transports reached Panormus aided by an opportune wind.

=== Motya retaken ===
The Carthaginians, reinforced by Elymian and Sikan soldiers first marched to Motya from Panormus. Eryx, which had been betrayed to Dionysius through treachery, now fell to Himilco. Himilco next attacked and captured Motya, but decided to establish a city at Lilybaeum to replace Motya before marching north. When the Sicanis refused to join Dionysius or leave their cities and the Sicel city Halyciae switched sides, Dionysius retreated to Syracuse after despoiling lands in Western Sicily. The siege of Segesta and Entella was over.

=== Lipari subdued ===
Himilco chose not to march to Syracuse along the southern coast of Sicily, as Dionysius had destroyed all the crops and hostile Greek cities stood on his path. After garrisoning Carthaginian territory, he made treaties with the cities of Thermae and Cephaleodium on the north coast of Sicily to secure his supply route. Himilco attacked Lipari (whose Dorian Greek inhabitants were notorious pirates and could pose a threat to Carthaginian supplies) with 300 triremes and 300 transports, captured the island and forced the Greeks to pay 30 talents as ransom. Then he sailed and disembarked at Cape Pelorum, 12 miles to the north of Messina.

== Messina captured ==
Himilco did not march directly to Messina. When the Messinian army marched north, Himilco sent 200 triremes manned with picked rowers and soldiers to the city. Aided by a favourable wind, this fleet managed to arrive and capture the city before the Greeks doubled back. Had Himilco also defeated the Messinian army his would have won a complete victory, but he allowed the surviving Greeks to take refuge in nearby mountain fortresses, which Carthaginians could not quickly reduce.

=== Strategic Solution: founding of Tauromenium ===
Himilco chose not to occupy Messina permanently, although it would have given Carthage permanent control over the Strait of Messina. Himilco probably was not confident of holding an area so far from Carthage. He faced a strategic dilemma: if he took time to reduce the mountain fortresses of Messina, Dionysius would have time to prepare or launch an attack on Carthaginian Sicily. If Himilco simply marched off, the Messinian Greeks could harass his rear. Dividing the army would weaken his striking power against Dionysius. Himilco found a clever solution to his strategic problem. The Carthaginians founded a city at Tauromenium, south of Messina and populated it with Sicels. This encouraged all the Sicel cities except Assurous to abandon Dionysius. Thus Himilco weakened his enemy while gaining additional allies and protection from the Messinian Greeks.

== Battle of Catana ==
The Carthaginians marched south, with the fleet sailing along the coast but an eruption of Mt. Etna made the roads near Naxos impassable. The Carthaginian army under Himilco marched around the mountain while the navy under Mago sailed to Catana, where the army rejoined Mago's force after covering the 110 km trek in two days. Without the army's protection, the beached Carthaginian ships were vulnerable to the army of Dionysius, which had assembled at Catana. However, Mago managed to defeat the Greek fleet under Leptines, and Dionysius withdrew to Syracuse before Himilco arrived with the Carthaginian army.

== Siege of Syracuse ==
From Catana Himilco marched south to Syracuse and camped to the south of the city while the Carthaginian fleet entered the Great Harbour. Himilco built his fortified camp near the temple of Zeus, then built 3 additional forts and employed 3,000 transports to bring in supplies for the Carthaginian force, while 208 warships were stationed at Syracuse. The land around Syracuse was ravaged for 30 days. The winter of 397 BC was spent in small skirmishes. In the spring of 396 BC, the Carthaginians captured the areas of the city not protected by walls and destroyed the temple of Demeter. During the summer a plague swept through the Carthaginian army, decimating their ranks. Dionysius launched a night attack that captured 2 forts but was unable to take the main camp. The Greek fleet also managed to burn and capture many of the Carthaginian ships – many of which was not properly manned.

Himilco chose to open negotiations with Dionysius. A bribe of 300 silver talents ensured the safe passage of 40 ships bearing all the Carthaginian citizens to Carthage. Himilco abandoned his mercenaries and allies to their fate. The Sicilians went home, the Iberians joined Dionysius while the rest were enslaved.

The people of Carthage were outraged by Himilco's actions and the Libyans revolted and besieged the city. It is not known if Himilco was summoned before the tribunal of Hundred and Four. It was said that Himilco accepted full responsibility for the disaster, dressed up as a slave and then went to all the temples of the city, begging forgiveness. After that he bricked himself up in his house, refused to see his family and starved himself to death. His successor was Mago the Second.

== Bibliography ==
- Baker, G. P. (1999). Hannibal. Cooper Square Press. ISBN 0-8154-1005-0.
- Warry, John (1993). Warfare in The Classical World. Salamander Books Ltd. ISBN 1-56619-463-6.
- Lancel, Serge (1997). Carthage A History. Blackwell Publishers. ISBN 1-57718-103-4.
- Bath, Tony (1992). Hannibal's Campaigns. Barns & Noble. ISBN 0-88029-817-0.
- Kern, Paul B. (1999). Ancient Siege Warfare. Indiana University Publishers. ISBN 0-253-33546-9.
- Freeman, Edward A. (1892). Sicily Phoenician, Greek & Roman, Third Edition. T. Fisher Unwin.
- Church, Alfred J. (1886). Carthage, 4th Edition. T. Fisher Unwin.

== See also ==
- Agrigentum inscription
- Greek-Punic wars
