= Battle of Gela =

The Battle of Gela may refer to:

- Battle of Gela (405 BC)
- Battle of Gela (1943)
