= Mazaro =

River in Sicily, Italy

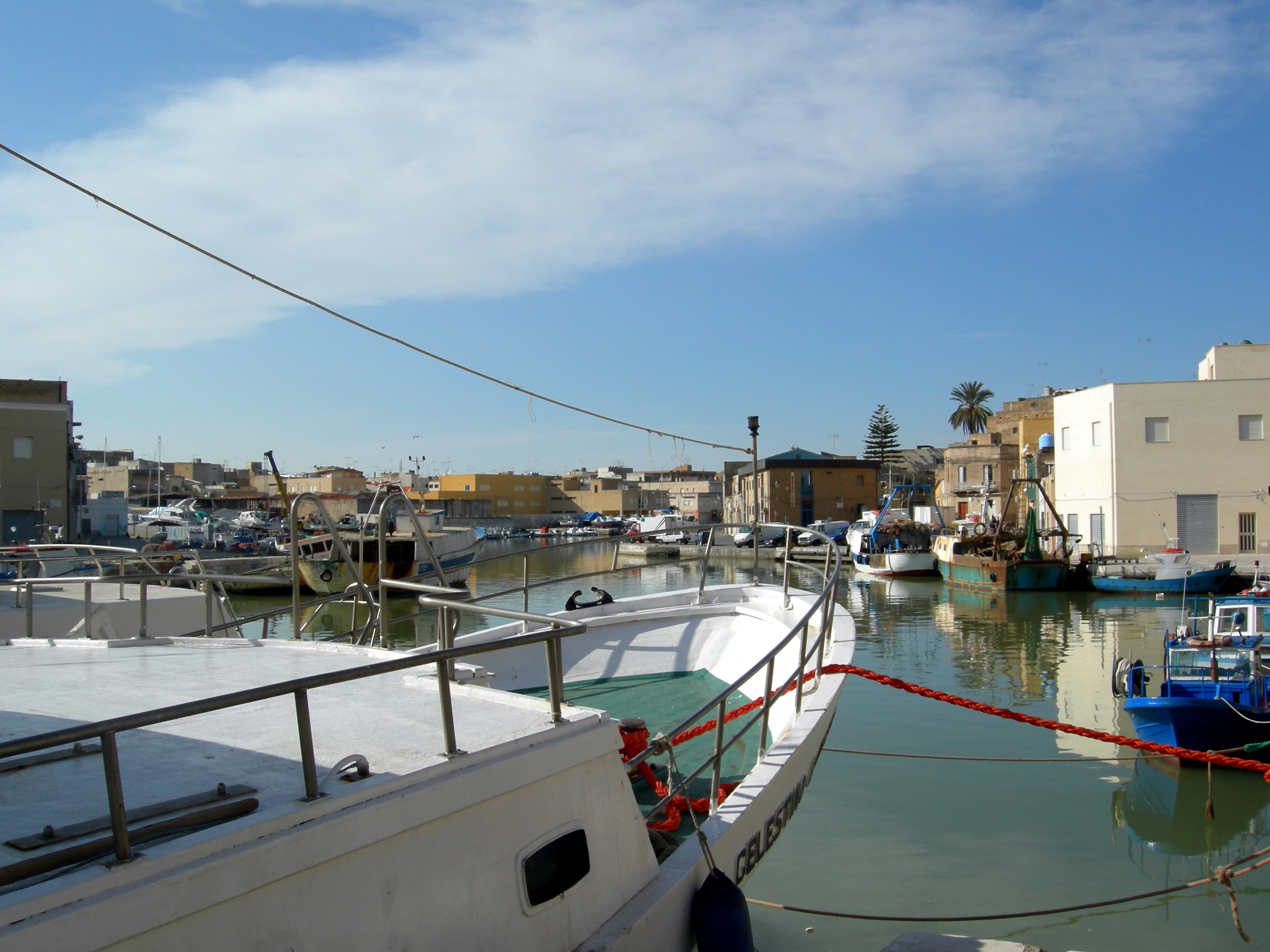
- Fishing boats along the Mazaro river, in Mazara del Vallo.

Location
- Country: Italy

Physical characteristics
- Source
  - location: Rapicaldo, Salemi
- Mouth: Mediterranean Sea
  - location: Strait of Sicily, Mazara del Vallo
  - coordinates: 37.6512°N 12.5856°E
- Length: 28 km (17 mi)

The Mazaro (Italian: [ˈmaddzaro]; sometimes spelled as Màzaro) is a river in Sicily, Italy.

The Mazaro river flows 28 kilometres (17 mi) across south-western Sicily, from its source in Rapicaldo, located within the Salemi city boundaries, to the Mediterranean Sea in Mazara del Vallo.

Mazaro is a historically important river which has provided water and farming for the people living around it for centuries. The Greeks and Muslims used the river for water to supply their armies in Sicily. The river is shallow. It is connected to the Mediterranean Sea.

== "Mad sea" phenomenon ==
The river is characterized by a periodical phenomenon locally known as marrobbio (also known in English as "mad sea"), which consist in rapid and dramatic sea level oscillations seemingly caused by sudden atmospheric pressure changes; similar phenomena were observed only in a very few other places in the world, including Nagasaki Bay in Japan (where the phenomenon is known as abiki) and Ciutadella (in Menorca, Spain, where it is called rissaga).
