= Agrigentum inscription =

Punic inscription from the 5th century BC

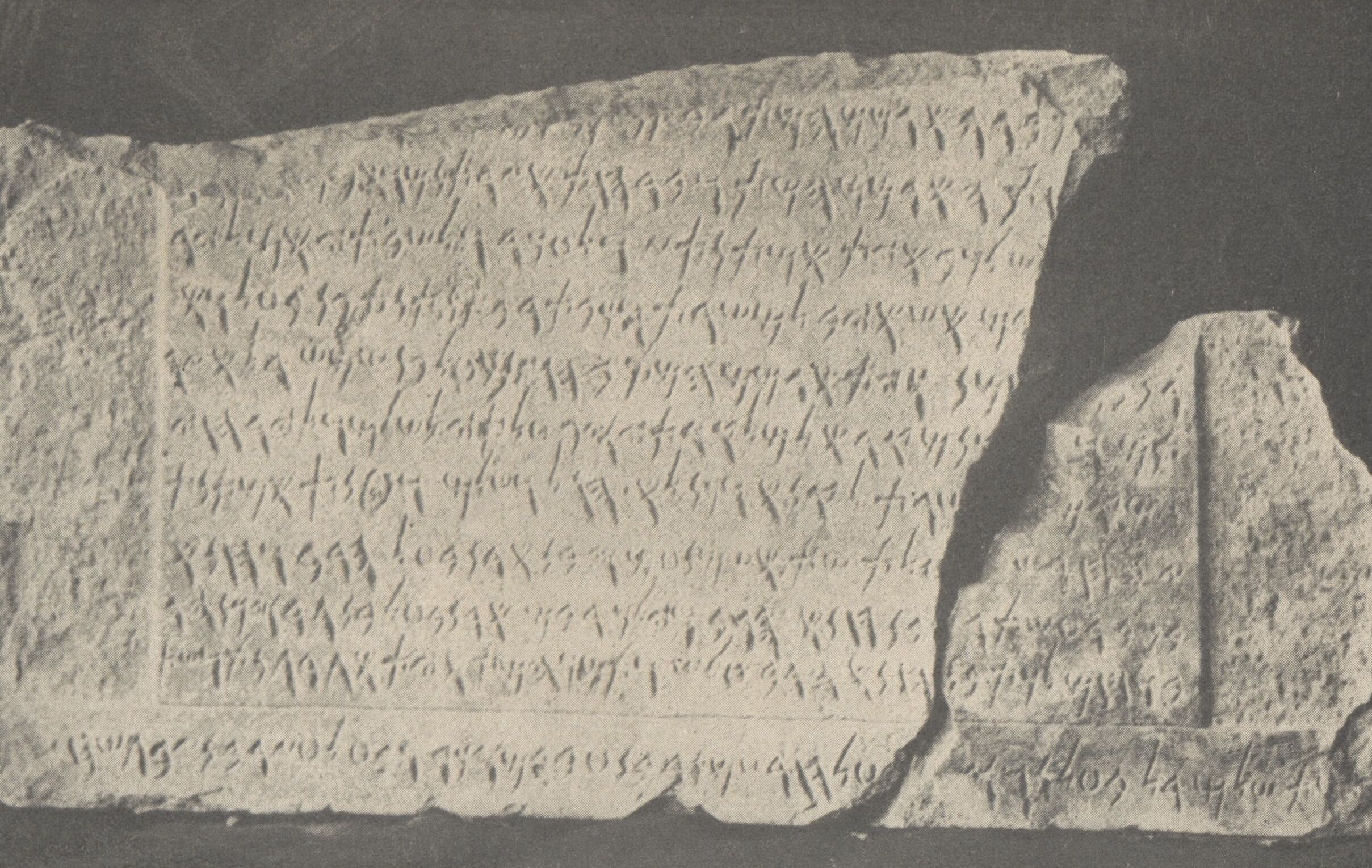
The Agrigentum inscription

The Agrigentum inscription is a Punic inscription (KAI 302, CIS i 5510) found in 1934 during the excavations led by Gabriel-Guillaume Lapeyre at "Salambo", the infant and children's cemetery (tophet) of Carthage, and published in 1942. It probably refers to military events in Sicily in 406 BCE.

== Text of the inscription ==
The inscription has been broken into three parts; it is not clear how much text is missing before "line 1". The surviving text reads:

(line 1)	... WY]KBD H’DMM HMT RBTN [TNT-PN-B‘L LM TŠPṬ ? ..........	... and] let these men honor Our Lady [Tanit-Phanebal, lest She ...
(2)	... BR]ḤT H’DMM HMT WBRḤT ’ZRTNM W’[............	... condemns the int]ent of those men and the intent of their families (?) and [?the intent of their ...
(3)	WKL ’DM] ’Š LKP ’YT ’MTNT Z WL‘KR WLŠBT Y’ML YD[’	And as for any man] who upsets this stele or disturbs or destroys it, may [his] hand wither.
(4)	WKL ’]DM ’Š ’YBL MŠRT WKPT RBTN TNT-PN-B‘L	[And as for any m]an who does not serve (the goddess), then Our Lady Tinnīt-Phanebal will bind,
(4-5)	W’/DN B[‘L] ḤMN ’YT ’DMM HMT BḤYM ‘L PN ŠMŠ	and the / Lord Ba[‘al]-ḥammon (will bind) those men during their life facing the Sun
(5-6)	DL ’ZR/TM W’[..]NM	together with their families / and their [...]s.
(6-7)	QR’ LMLQRT YSP ‘LTY LŠLM WLYRḤY / BMQM [Z]	(But) as for him who calls to Melqart, he shall continue to be greeted and be made welcome / in [this] place.
(7)	ŠRT LQN’ WKN L’.ḤL WŠLM	He who serves (the gods) zealously, (for him) there will be wealth and prosperity.
(7-8)	WṬNT ’MTNT / Z BḤDŠ [P]‘LT	And this stele was erected / on the new moon of (the month of) [Pa]‘loth,
(8)	ŠT ’ŠMN‘MS BN ’DNB‘L HRB	in the year (of the suffetes) Ešmûn-‘amos, the son of ’Adoniba‘al (Hannibal?) the general,
(8-9)	WḤN’ / BN BD‘ŠTR[T] BN ḤN’ HRB	and Ḥanno, / the son of Bod‘aštar[t], the son of Ḥanno the general.
(9-10)	WYLK RBM ’DNB‘L BN GRSKN HR/B	And they marched, the generals ’Adoniba‘al, the son of Gersakkun the gene/ral,
(10)	WḤMLKT BN ḤN’ HRB ‘LŠ	and Ḥimilco, the son of Ḥanno the general, at dawn (?).
(10-11)	WTMK HMT ’YT ’GRGNT WŠT / [’]T ŠLM DL B‘LNWS	And they [the Carthaginians] seized Agrigentum, and they put / peace ("pacified", i.e., they submitted them) together with the refugees (from Agrigentum).
(11)	[WB]‘LḤRŠ MNR BN ‘BDMSKR WB‘L‘ZR BN ZBG ŠḤ[N’ ...	[And the ar]tisans (of this monument) are Menir, the son of Abdmeskar, and Baal-Eser, the son of Zabog the son of Ḥ[anno. ...

== Historical context ==
The monument can be dated to 406 BCE, on the basis of an action by two Carthaginian generals, ’Adnoiba‘al (Idnibal) and Ḥimilco, who are mentioned in lines 9-10. The Greek historian Diodorus Siculus tells that both generals were active in a Carthaginian military campaign in Sicily in 406 BCE, in particular the siege and taking of the city of Akragas (Bibliotheca historica, 13.43.5 and 13.80.1-2). Now Charles R. Krahmalkov recognized this city's name in the word ’GRGNT (Agragant) in line 10. The taking of this city and the "pacification" of its inhabitants are mentioned in line 11 of the inscription. From Diodorus Siculus we may assume that the refugees from Akragas tried to flee to the city of Gela, 60 kilometers east of Agrigento.

A bonus of the inscription is that it gives the names of the eponymous heads of state of Carthage, the so-called suffetes (šofetim), for this year: Ešmûn-‘amos and Ḥanno (lines 8–9).

The importance of this inscription was described by Schmitz:

A convergence of classical historiography with Greek and Punic epigraphy would be unique in the prosopography of fifth-century Sicily and of considerable interest to classical historians as well as to Semitists. (p. 4)

The reference here to "Greek epigraphy" regards a Greek inscription from Athens and also from 406 BCE, mentioning Sicily and the names of the two Carthaginian generals. It was probably a probouleuma (draft resolution for the Athenian government), to send envoys to the Carthaginian generals asking them for help in the final phase of the Peloponnesian War.
