= Siege of Akragas (406 BC) =

Siege during the Sicilian wars with Carthage

Coordinates: 37°19′N 13°35′E

- Part of The Sicilian Wars
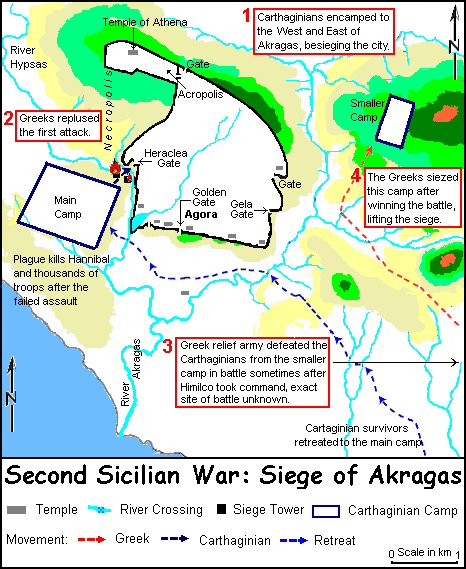
- Siege of Akragas 406 BC – generic representation of a possible scenario
Date	April–December 406 BC
Location	Akragas
Result	Carthaginian victory
Territorial changes	Akragas sacked

Belligerents
Carthage	Akragas; Syracuse

Commanders and leaders
Hannibal Mago; Himilco Hanno	Daphnaeus; Dexippus

Strength
60,000; 120 triremes 1,000 transport ships	35,000; 40 triremes Supply convoy

Casualties and losses
6,000 killed 15 triremes lost	8 triremes sunk Supply convoy captured Population massacred

The siege of Akragas took place in 406 BC in Sicily; the Carthaginian enterprise ultimately lasted a total of eight months. The Carthaginian army under Hannibal Mago besieged the Dorian Greek city of Akragas in retaliation for the Greek raids on Punic colonies in Sicily. The city managed to repel Carthaginian attacks until a relief army from Syracuse defeated part of the besieging Carthaginian army and lifted the siege of the city.

During the siege, Hannibal and a large number of Carthaginian soldiers perished from the plague, and the survivors were in dire straits after the Greeks managed to cut their supply lines. The Carthaginians, now led by Himilco, a Magonid kinsman of Hannibal, managed to capture a Greek supply convoy of ships using the Carthaginian fleet, which forced the Greeks to face the threat of starvation in turn. This caused first the Sicilian Greek detachment, then most of the population of Akragas to leave the city, enabling Himilco to capture and sack the city.

== Background ==
Carthage had stayed away from Sicilian affairs for almost seventy years following the defeat at Himera in 480 BC; during the intervening time Greek culture had started to penetrate the Elymian, Sikanian and Sicel cities in Sicily. The Greek tyrannies of Syracuse and Akragas, which were responsible for the victory at Himera, had fallen apart by 460 BCE and the Greeks had to fend off the challenge of Ducetius in addition infighting among themselves. The inactivity of Carthage regarding Sicily changed in 411 when the Ionian Greek (former Elymian) city Segesta clashed with the Dorian Greek city Selinus and got the worst of the conflict. Segesta then appealed to Carthage for aid. This appeal came at a time when the mainland Greek cities were locked in the Peloponnesian War, and Syracuse, an ally of Sparta, was not focused on Sicily. The Syracusan fleet was operating in the Aegean Sea, and Syracuse was in conflict with Naxos and Leontini, two Ionian Greek cities sympathetic to another Ionic city, Athens, the enemy of Sparta.

The Carthaginian Senate, after some debate, agreed to intervene on behalf of Segesta. Carthage raised an army and fleet for the expedition in 410 BC and dispatched the force to Sicily after diplomatic efforts for a compromise between Selinus and Segesta had failed. Hannibal Mago of Carthage led the expedition, took the city of Selinus by storm in 409 and then also destroyed the city of Himera. Syracuse and Akragas, the leading Greek cities in Sicily, did not confront Carthage at that time, and the Carthaginian army withdrew with the spoils of war after garrisoning their territory in Western Sicily. For three years, a lull fell on Sicily. No treaties had been signed between the Greeks and Carthaginians to signal a closure of hostilities.

== Prelude to Akragas ==
While the governments of Syracuse and Akragas took only preventive measures, Hermocrates, an exiled general of Syracuse, sought to take a more aggressive stance on the issue of Carthaginian aggression, hoping that his actions would enable him to return to Syracuse and assume a political position. He hired 2,000 mercenaries (1,000 of them former citizens of Himera) and five ships and then set up a base in the ruins of Selinus, building a wall for security around the acropolis. His force ultimately swelled to 6,000 men, (many former citizens of Selinus had joined him) and Hermocrates started to raid Punic territories at his discretion. He first defeated the men of Motya, then ravaged their land. His next target was the territory of "Golden Shell", the land around Panormus. In 407 BCE, the Greeks defeated the citizens of Panormus (killing 500 of them) and plundered at will, retiring to Selinus with their spoils. These activities gained Hermocrates fame and sympathy with Sicilian Greeks, but no recall from Syracuse.

Hermocrates then collected the bones of the Greek dead left unburied at Himera and sent them over to Syracuse for burial, an act that further enhanced his reputation among the Greeks (and brought about the downfall of Diocles, the Syracusan leader defeated at Himera and who had actually left the bones unburied) but did not end his exile from Syracuse. The general finally tried to stage a coup in Syracuse, where he died in a street fight. Syracuse and Akragas did not neglect their defences during the activities of Hermocrates. Akragas, expecting to be the first target of any Carthaginian retaliation, set about expanding its army while Syracuse started to expand its fleet. The walls of both the cities were also kept in repair.

=== Greek preparations ===
Syracuse and Akragas took speedy action to prepare for the expected Punic response after the downfall of Hermocrates. Syracuse appealed to the cities of Magna Graecia and even Sparta for help, while a general named Daphnaeus was elected to lead the Syracusan war effort. An officer named Dionysius, who had been a cohort of the fallen Hermocrates, was also elected as part of the army command staff. The Greeks started gathering an army at Syracuse which included Greeks from Camarina, Gela, Messene, and Italy in addition to mercenaries, but Sparta was unable to send aid at this time. Akragas hired the Spartan general Dexippus with a band of 1,500 hoplites and some Campanian mercenaries (previously serving under Hannibal Mago at Himera) to augment their force of 10,000 troops. Syracuse posted a fleet of forty triremes at Eryx to watch for the movement of the Punic navy.

=== Carthage makes ready ===
The Carthaginian Senate had offered the command of the coming expedition to Hannibal Mago (the “Greek Hater”), who at first refused the position pleading advanced age. When his kinsman Himilco was appointed as his deputy, Hannibal set about making preparations in earnest. Aside from Carthaginian citizens, troops were levied from Africa, Spain, and Italy, so an army of 120,000 men (probably exaggerated; around 60,000 is closer to the truth) and a fleet of 120 triremes and 1,000 transports were made ready by the Spring of 406 BCE. Carthage doubled the numbers of triremes (only 60 triremes had escorted the expeditions of 480 and 409) because the Syracusan navy had returned from mainland Greece, posing a severe threat to the Carthaginian expedition.

Hannibal, before sailing with the main fleet, sent 40 triremes to Sicily, where these ships met the Greek fleet stationed at Eryx and lost fifteen of their number in a skirmish. The main Punic fleet then set sail, led by a vanguard of 50 triremes, while the rest sailed with the main fleet. The outnumbered Greek ships now gave way and the Punic expedition safely landed near Motya.

== Nature of opposing forces ==
=== Carthaginian forces ===
The Libyans supplied both heavy and light infantry and formed the most disciplined units of the army. The heavy infantry fought in close formation, armed with long spears and round shields, wearing helmets and linen cuirasses. The light Libyan infantry carried javelins and a small shield, same as Iberian light infantry. The Iberian infantry wore purple bordered white tunics and leather headgear. The Heavy infantry fought in a dense phalanx, armed with heavy throwing spears, long body shields and short thrusting swords. Campanian, Sardinian and Gallic infantry fought in their native gear, but often were equipped by Carthage. Sicels and other Sicilians were equipped like Greek Hoplites.

The Libyans, Carthaginian citizens and the Libyo-Phoenicians provided disciplined, well trained cavalry equipped with thrusting spears and round shields. Numidia provided superb light cavalry armed with bundles of javelins and riding without bridle or saddle. Iberians and Gauls also provided cavalry, which relied on the all out charge. Carthage at this time did not use elephants, but Libyans provided bulk of the heavy, four horse war chariots for Carthage.

The Punic navy was built around the trireme, Carthaginian citizens usually served alongside recruits from Libya and other Carthaginian domains.

=== Greek forces ===
The mainstay of the Greek army was the Hoplite, drawn mainly from the citizens, but a large number of mercenaries from Italy and Greece as well. Sicels and other native Sicilians also served in the army as hoplites and also supplied peltasts, and a number of Campanians, probably equipped like Samnite or Etruscan warriors, were present as well. The Phalanx was the standard fighting formation of the army. The cavalry was recruited from wealthier citizens and hired mercenaries. In a siege situation, old men and women served as impromptu peltasts. Large Sicilian cities like Syracuse and Akragas field up to 10,000 – 20,000 citizens, augmented by mercenaries or freed slaves whenever needed. There is no mention of an Akragan navy, but the relief force had 30 triremes.

== Siege of Akragas ==
The Carthaginian army was unopposed by the Greeks when they marched towards Akragas in the early summer of 406 BC. Hannibal left his warships at Motya before setting out for Akragas. The citizens of Akragas, not wanting to face the Carthaginians by themselves or contribute to their spoils, had gathered the harvest and the entire population (some 200,000 people) within the city as part of their preparations. Hannibal began preparation for the siege in earnest once his army reached Akragas. Two fortified camps were built, one camp (protected by a ditch and palisade) on the western side of Akragas on the right bank of river Hypsas, the other on the left bank of the river Akragas, housing about a third of the army, on the east side of the city, blocking the roads to Gela. The Akragans did not oppose these activities, but stayed within their city.

Hannibal offered terms to the city before commencing hostilities: Akragas would either become an ally of Carthage or stay neutral while Carthage dealt with the other Greeks in Sicily. Both conditions were rejected by the Akragan government. The entire male population of the city was armed and posted on the walls, the mercenaries were placed on the hill of Athena (some argue they were posted at the acropolis), and some troops were placed in reserve to plug any gaps created by the Carthaginians on the city walls. After the final preparations were made, the Greeks awaited the Carthaginian assault.

Hannibal decided not to build circumvallation walls but to starve the Greeks into submission. The position of the city on high ground made it difficult to assault directly or storm from several directions at once. Hannibal chose to use two siege towers to assault one of the gates on the west side of the city. The Carthaginians managed to inflict casualties on the defenders, but after an all-day struggle, could not force the gate. At night the Greeks made a sortie and burnt the towers down. Hannibal then ordered his soldiers to tear down the tombs and other buildings outside the walls to make siege ramps, so any part of the city wall could be assaulted by siege engines. The Punic soldiers were uneasy about desecrating tombs, and they panicked when a plague broke out in the Carthaginian camps. The Carthaginians lost many men, including Hannibal himself.

== Siege fails ==
Himilco now assumed command of the Punic army. His first duty was to restore the morale of his soldiers, which he did by sacrificing a child to the god the Greeks associated with Cronos and some animals to the sea by drowning them, after putting a stop to the tomb-destroying activities. Then he continued building siege ramps using the materials already collected and also dammed the Hypsas River, (the course of which made it act as a moat for Akragas), for gaining better access to the city.

At this point Daphnaeus of Syracuse arrived with 30,000 hoplites and 5,000 cavalry to break the siege, accompanied by thirty triremes. The Greek army may have been larger as light troops are not included in the tally. Himilco led the mercenaries in the eastern camp to intercept this army, while the main army stayed in their camp and kept the garrison of Akragas in check. A battle was joined somewhere on the right bank of the River Himera (the actual battle site is unidentified and subject to debate). The Punic army at first managed to create difficulties for the Italian Greeks stationed on the left of the Greek battle line, but the Syracusan right wing scattered their Punic counterparts before the Carthaginians gained any decisive advantage. The Greeks ultimately managed to defeat the Carthaginians in a hotly contested battle. The Punic army fled the field leaving almost 6,000 dead behind. Daphnaeus chose to regroup his soldiers before giving chase.

As the fleeing Carthaginians retreated past Akragas, the city dwellers clamored to be led out to attack the enemy, which their generals (including the Spartan Dexippus), refused to do, fearing a repeat of the Himera debacle of 409 BCE. The victory of the Syracusan-led army, which had not pursued the retreating Carthaginians also fearing a counterattack, had lifted the siege of the city, and the eastern camp of the Carthaginian army had fallen into Greek hands. This positioned the Greeks favorably against the Punic army, with the initiative firmly in their hands.

=== Conspiracy theories and consequences ===
The Akragan citizens joined the relief army at the captured Punic camp, and at once gossip spread among the Greeks that the Akragan generals had refused to attack the Carthaginian fugitives because they had been bribed by Himilco. An impromptu political council was held, and the Greeks of Camarina openly accused the five Akragan generals of treason, and four of the generals were stoned to death as a result. The fifth, named Argeus, was spared because of his youth. New officers were then elected to replace the generals. Daphnaeus, in overall command of the Greek army, scouted the main Carthaginian camp, and decided against a direct assault. The Greeks instead harassed the Carthaginians throughout the summer with light troops and cavalry, cutting off their supply lines and continuously skirmishing. The Greek army at Akragas was kept supplied by huge ship convoys carrying provisions from Syracuse. The Carthaginians soon faced food shortages, and the mercenaries began to grow restless as starvation set in in the Punic camp. Himilco managed to keep the army together with difficulty. As winter approached, the situation grew from serious to desperate for the Carthaginians.

== Himilco triumphs ==
The Carthaginians learned of the approach of a supply convoy from Syracuse. Himilco managed to convince the mercenaries to stay put for a few more days, by giving them the gold/silver drinking cups of the Carthaginian citizens, then sent word to the Carthaginian fleet to sortie from Motya/Panormus. The Carthaginian fleet of forty ships arrived from the West, and managed to surprise the escorting Syracusan fleet, which may have grown complacent due to their command of the sea, and sank eight Greek triremes escorting the grain ships. When the surviving Greek triremes beached themselves, the Carthaginian flotilla captured the entire convoy. This solved the supply problems for Himilco, and caused the Greeks in turn to face the threat of starvation.

=== Greeks fall apart ===
The capture of the convoy caused rumors of impending food shortage at Akragas, where the population may not have planted any crops because of the ongoing conflict. Himilco secretly bribed the Campanian mercenaries, who deserted Akragas after complaining of food shortages. When the Akragan authorities found the remaining stocks of food inadequate to feed the whole Greek army, the Greek contingent from Magna Graecia also left Akragas.

The rapidly dwindling food stocks persuaded the Akragan authorities to abandon the city. In mid-December, 40,000 people along with the army, marched east for Gela, carrying whatever valuables they could out of the city. The sick, the old and some diehards stayed behind in Akragas. Himilco had little difficulty taking and pillaging the nearly empty city the following morning, putting to sword any who resisted. The siege had lasted for eight months.

== Aftermath ==
As winter had set in, Himilco did not push onto Gela but encamped at Akragas. The city, the richest in Sicily, was thoroughly plundered, and many priceless pieces of art were shipped to Carthage. The Carthaginian army would stay in the city until the spring of 405, when the campaign for Gela took place. Himilco would demolish the city before marching east.

The refugees of Akragas accused Daphnaeus and the other generals of treason in Syracuse. This caused a great upheaval which ultimately brought Dionysius I of Syracuse to the role of supreme commander, which he ultimately turned into a dictatorship.

The city of Akragas, destroyed in 405 BC, would again be populated by Greeks, although it would not reach the level of wealth and power it had previously enjoyed. It would grow powerful enough to oppose both Carthage and Syracuse in the struggle these cities would engage in for the next hundred years.

== Bibliography ==
- Baker, G. P. (1999). Hannibal. Cooper Square Press. ISBN 0-8154-1005-0.
- Bath, Tony (1992). Hannibal's Campaigns. Barnes & Noble. ISBN 0-88029-817-0.
- Church, Alfred J. (1886). Carthage (4th ed.). T. Fisher Unwin.
- Freeman, Edward A. (1892). Sicily: Phoenician, Greek & Roman (3rd ed.). T. Fisher Unwin.
- Kern, Paul B. (1999). Ancient Siege Warfare. Indiana University Publishers. ISBN 0-253-33546-9.
- Lancel, Serge (1997). Carthage: A History. Blackwell Publishers. ISBN 1-57718-103-4.
- Warry, John (1993) [1980]. Warfare in The Classical World: An Illustrated Encyclopedia of Weapons, Warriors and Warfare in the Ancient Civilisations of Greece and Rome. New York: Barnes & Noble. ISBN 1-56619-463-6.
