= Hannibal Mago =

Carthaginian shofet and general (died 406 BC)

Hannibal Mago (Punic: 𐤇𐤍𐤁𐤏𐤋, ḥnbʿl) was a grandson of Hamilcar Mago. He predates the more famous Carthaginian general Hannibal by about 200 years.

== Career ==
He was shofet (judge) of Carthage in 410 BC and in 409 BC commanded a Carthaginian army sent to Sicily in response to a request from the city of Segesta. In the Battle of Selinus he successfully took the Greek city of Selinus and then Himera. In the process of this conquest he was said to have killed some 3,000 prisoners of war, reportedly as revenge for the defeat his grandfather suffered in the Battle of Himera 70 years before.

== Death ==
In 406 BC Hannibal Mago died in a plague that broke out during the siege of Agrigento.

== See also ==
- Agrigentum inscription
- Other Hannibals in Carthaginian history
- Magonids
