= History of Greek Sicily =

Period of Sicilian history

The history of Greek Sicily (Ancient Greek: Σικελία) began with the foundation of the first Greek colonies around the mid 8th century BC. The Greeks of Sicily were known as Siceliotes.

Over the following centuries many conflicts between the city-states occurred until around 276 BC Pyrrhus of Epirus managed to conquer the whole island except Carthaginian Lilybaeum. After the First Punic War in 241 BC the island was conquered by the Romans.

== Territory ==
=== Cities ===
The first Greek colonies were founded in eastern Sicily in the 8th century BC when the Chalcidian Greeks founded Zancle, Naxos, Leontinoi and Katane; in the south-east corner the Corinthians founded Syracuse and the Megareans Megara Hyblaea, while on the western coast the Cretans and Rhodians founded Gela in 689 BC, with which the first Greek colonisation of Sicily ended.

The Greek cities of Sicily were apoikìai (newly founded cities detached from their cities of origin and led by an oikistes).

== Populations ==
=== Relations with other islanders ===
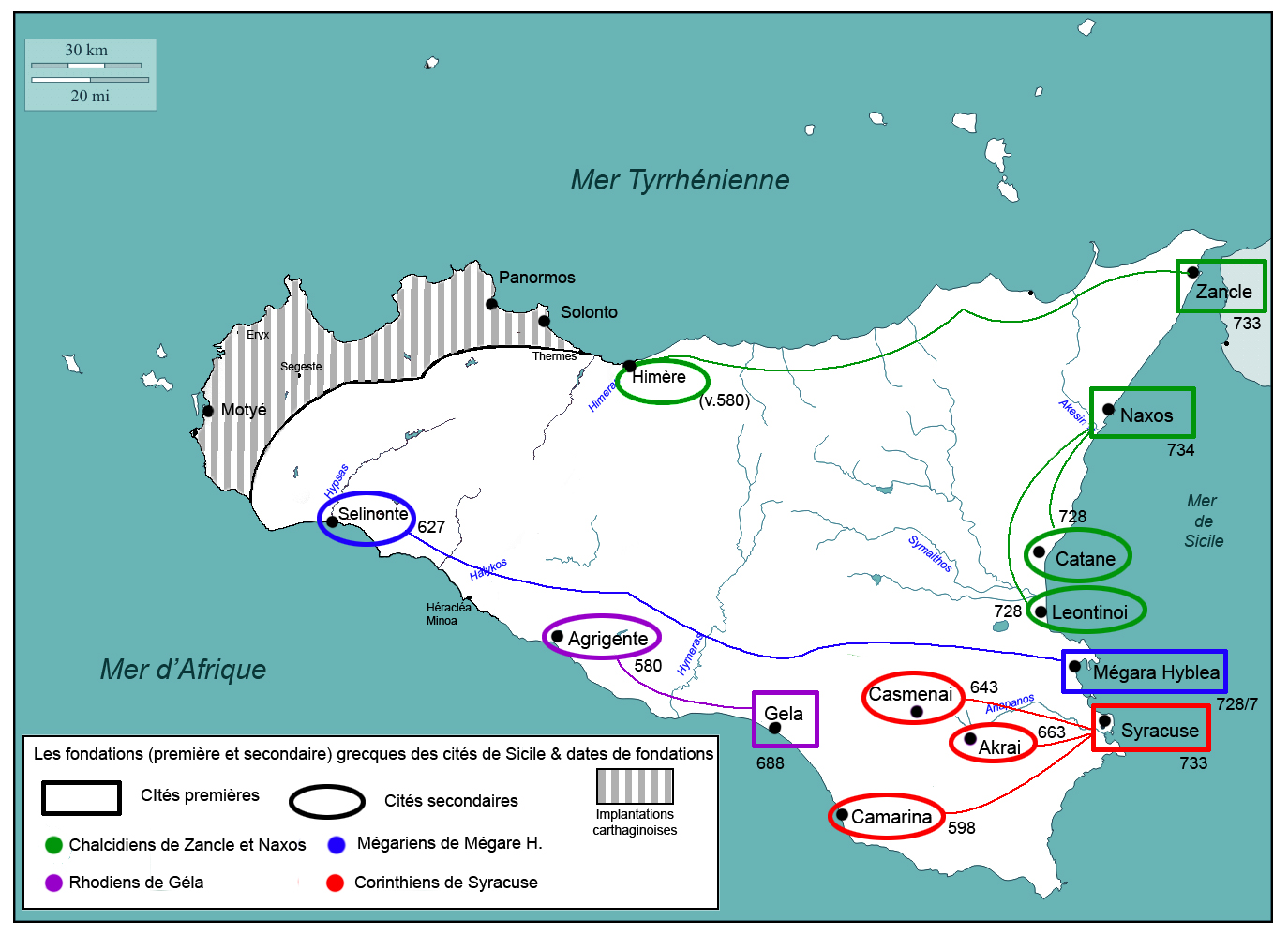
Map of the Greek colonies and sub-colonies in Sicily

The native inhabitants of the island were the Sicani, the Siculi and the Elimi. There were also small Phoenician trading posts in the west of the island. The growing Greek colonies eventually came into conflict with the Phoenicians, which led to a series of wars between them. As Greece was absorbed by Rome in a series of conquests and alliances, the Romans carried on the Greco-Punic wars as the Roman-Punic wars.

As the Greeks sought to colonize the island, and the Phoenicians merely desired sporadic outposts for their trading network with little intent on direct control, conflict between the Greeks and the Siculi took on the nature of a colonizer/colonized relationship, while the Phoenicians frequently played the role of a third party in playing entities off against each other in however a way best fit their commercial interests. The Phoenicians would consequently align with weaker Greek actors against more dominant Greek actors, or align with the Siculi against Greek settlements.

In the end, ethnic Greek settlement was substantive on Sicily, while Carthaginian settlement was fleeting.

== History ==
=== Origins ===
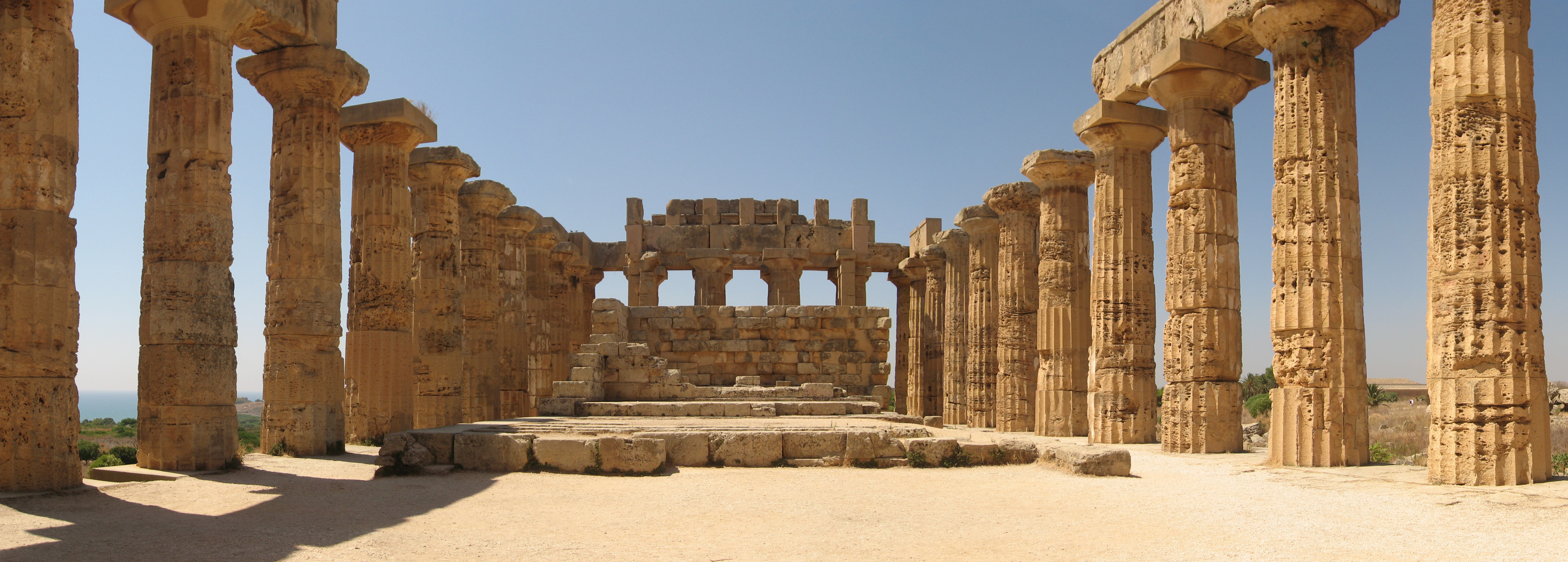
Interior of Temple E (known as the Temple of Hera) at Selinunte (in Greek Σελινοῦς).

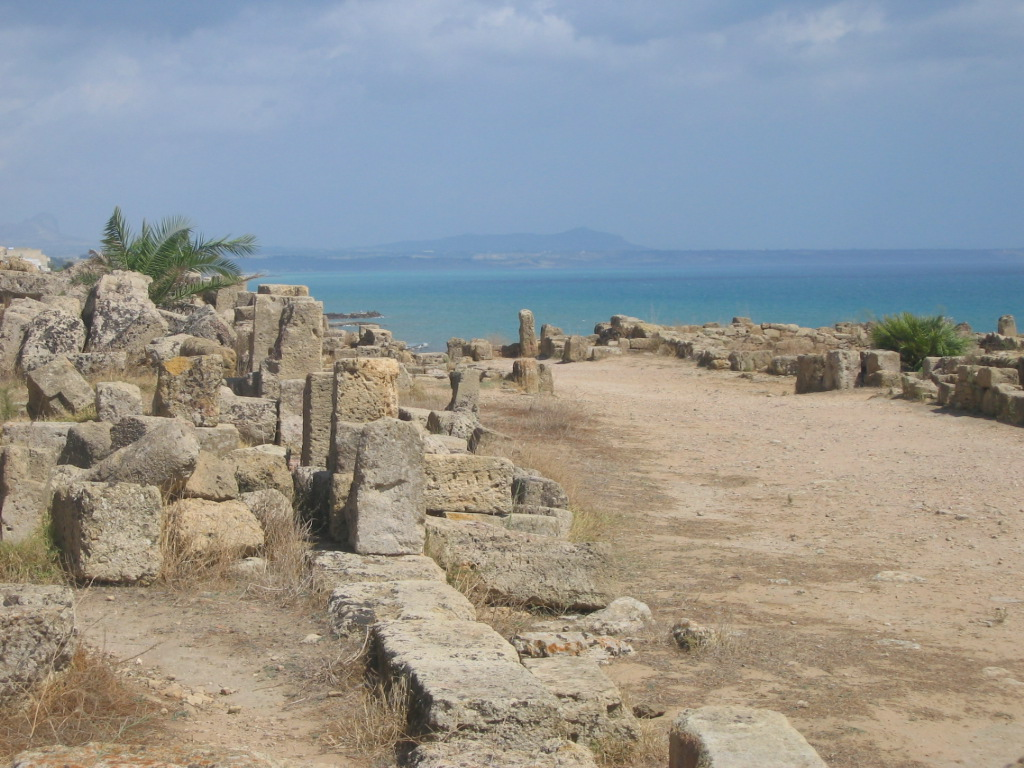
The acropolis at Selinunte

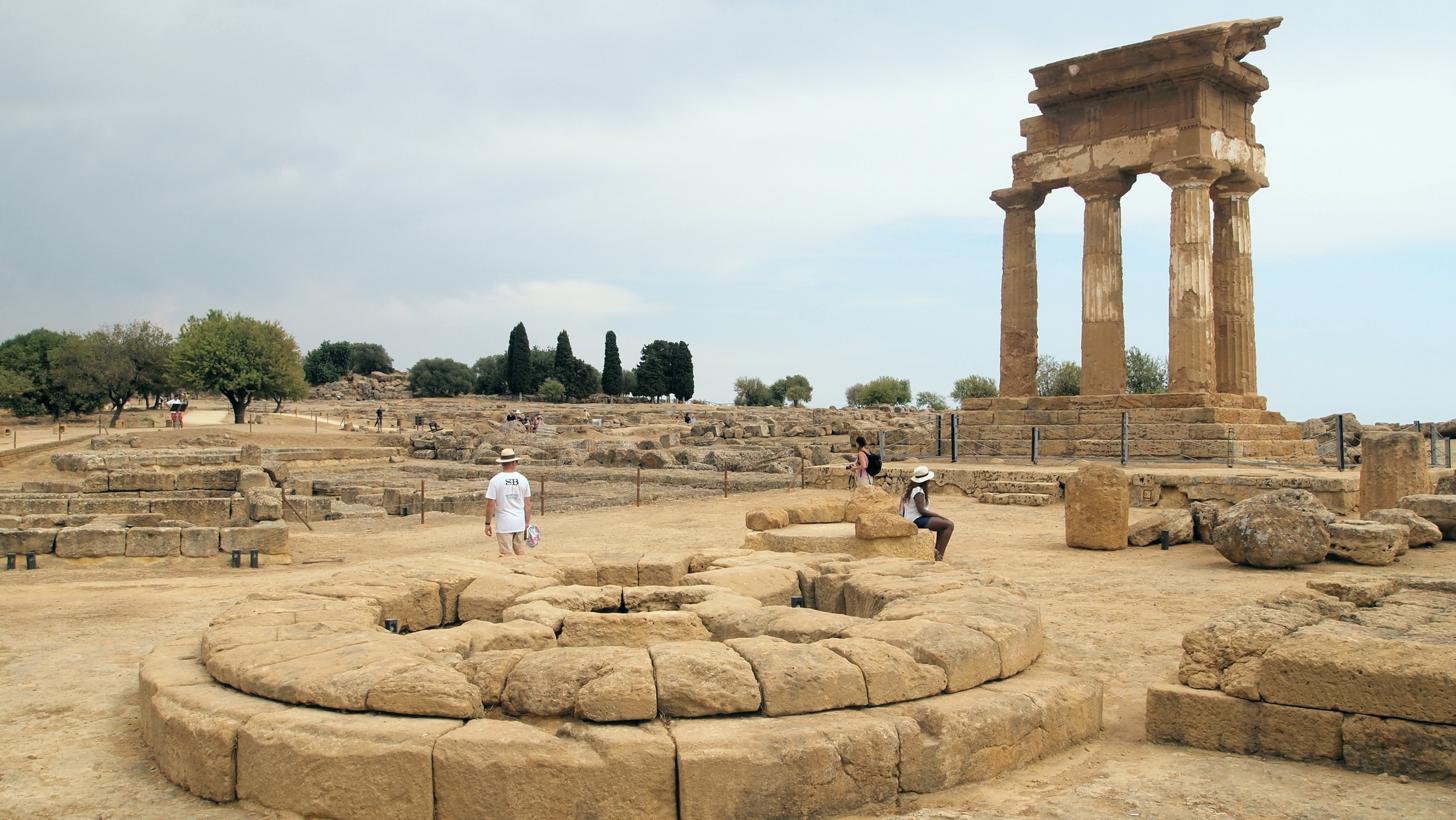
Temple of the Dioscuri at Agrigento.

Homeric Thrinacia (Θρινακίη from θρῖναξ "trident"), the island of Helios' cattle, was later identified with Sicily, and re-interpreted as Trinakria (Τρινακρία, from τρεῖς and ἄκραι, as "[island] with three headlands").

Thucydides writes that the first Greek colonies were founded by aristoi (exclusive aristocracies) after the internal struggles following the return from the Trojan War. However, the first sites chosen indicated a commercial strategy; Messina, Naxos, Reggio, Catania and Syracuse were all ports on one of the most important trade routes of the era and became points from which to control them.

The earliest Greek colonies in Sicily are all on its east coast, showing the importance of the trade route through the Straits of Messina. The metropoleis from which the Greek colonists came were usually also the source of the new cities' (poleis) names. Once consolidated, the colonies also produced sub-colonies for military or commercial purposes; Akrai and Casmene, for example, probably originated as military outposts of Syracuse.

=== The first tyrants ===
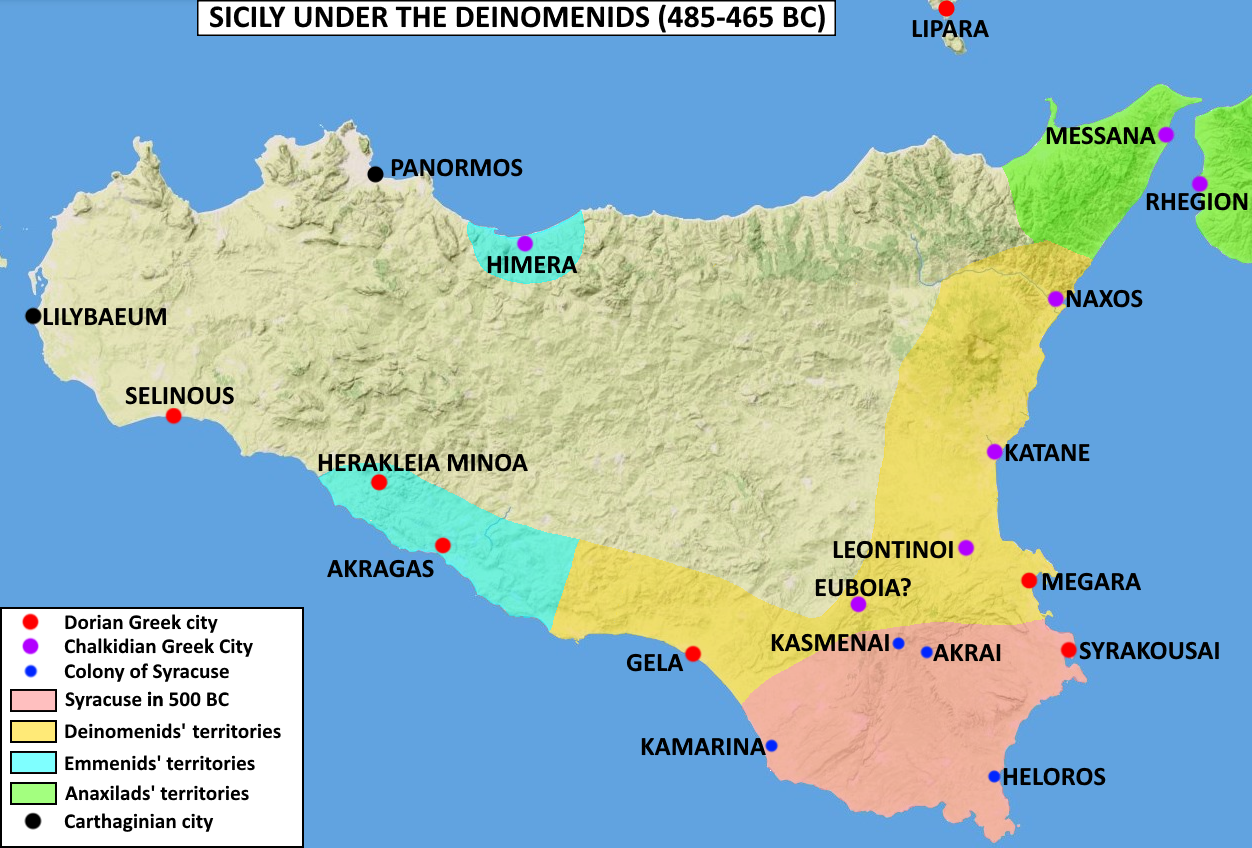
Sicily under the Deinomenids (485-465 BC)

The 6th century BC proved a period of prosperity and population growth in Sicily, but also saw conflict both within the colonies and between them and the local populations. Some individuals profited from this and took power through despotic and brutal means and expansionist policies. In 570 BC Phalaris became tyrant of Akragas, followed by Cleander in Gela in 505 BC, succeeded by his brother Hippocrates. To secure his power, he conquered the rest of eastern Sicily, subduing Zancle (Messina), Naxos and Leontini, setting up tyrants there loyal to him but ultimately proving unable to conquer Syracuse. Hippocrates then concentrated his troops to march on Ibla (whose site is unknown), but died there and was succeeded by Gelon in 491 BC or 490 BC. After six years, Gelon conquered Syracuse without resistance (485 BC or 484 BC) and made it his capital, becoming its tyrant and leaving his brother Hiero to command Gela.

Gelon's rise to power reinforced the Greek-speaking presence on Sicily. The numbers of Siculi and Sicani were rising and so he fought a series of battles aimed at combating this perceived threat, turning Syracuse into a powerful city with an army and navy, repopulating it by moving people from Gela and adding some of the conquered Megareans. In only ten years Gelon became the richest and most powerful man in the Greek world and through an alliance with Theron of Acragas took control of most of Greek-speaking Sicily other than Selinunte and Messina (then controlled by Anaxilas of Reggio).

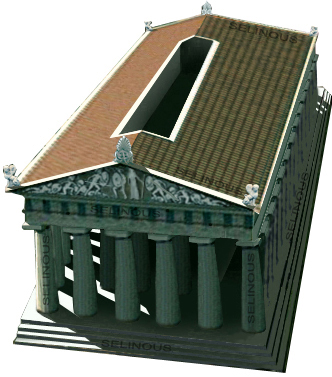
Reconstruction of the Temple of Victory, erected at Himera by the Greeks in memory of their victory there.

Terillus of Himera and Anaxilas sought help from Carthage, but Gelon and Teron gathered all the Siceliot forces on Sicily for a decisive engagement at Himera in 480 BC, where they defeated and killed Hamilcar, burned his ships and sold the captured Carthaginian troops into slavery. The resulting peace treaty also imposed a heavy indemnity on the enemy and (according to Herodotus) forced them to renounce human sacrifice, especially of first-born sons at Tofet. On Gelon's death in 476 BC he was succeeded by his brother Hiero, who in the same year conquered Catania and Naxos, deported their inhabitants to Leontini and refounded Catania as 'Aitna', entrusting it to his son Deinomenes and repopulating it with settlers from the Peloponnesus. In 474 BC his fleet defeated an Etruscan one-off Cumae, possibly to counter Etruscan expansion or possibly in response to a request from Cumae for assistance.

=== Democratic period (466-405 BC) ===
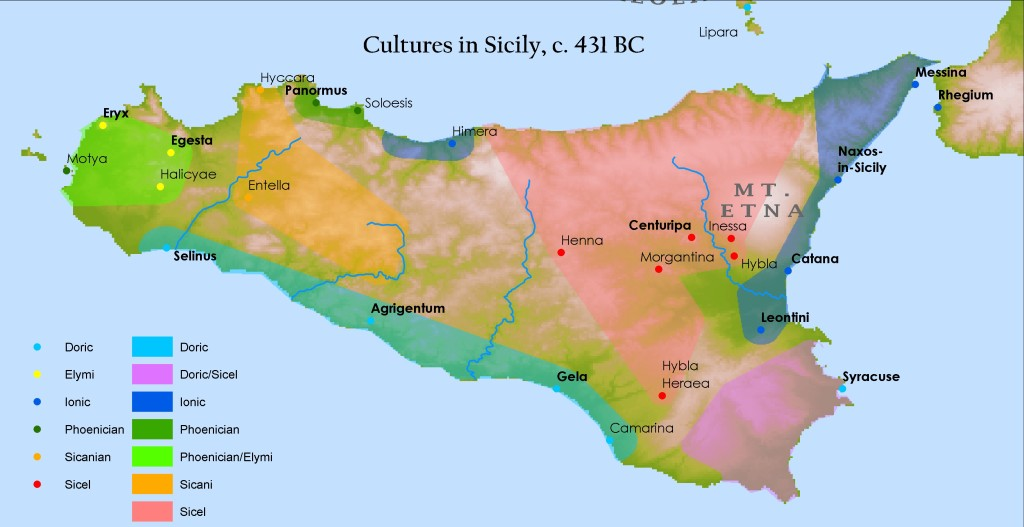
Sicilian cultures 431 BC

According to Diodorus Siculus, Trasibulus (Hiero's successor in Syracuse) and Thrasydaeus of Akragas were "violent murderers". Their cruelty seems to have provoked revolts which ended the first period of tyranny among the Greek colonies on Sicily, though Aristotle argues that their fall was mainly caused by internal struggles between powerful families. Trasideus was the first to fall, in his case to a coalition of Syracusan insurgents, Siculan troops and soldiers from Akragas, Gela, Selinunte and Himera.

Only Deinomenes remained in power in Aitna until a Siculan-Syracusan coalition forced its population to flee to the surrounding hills of Centuripe and Inessa (now Etna). Catania therefore re-assumed its former name and was repopulated again, this time with those exiled under Hiero and with Syracusan and Siculi colonists. Messina was freed from the tyranny of Anaxilas' sons around the same time.

In 452 BC a Hellenised Siculan called Ducetius, who had fought in the siege of Etna beside the Syracusans, led a vast Siculan league in revolt. Setting off from his birthplace of Mineo and destroying Inessa-Etna and Morgantina, he founded colonies of his own at strategic points to control the territory, including Palikè near the former sanctuary of the Palici. Around 450 BC he was heavily defeated by the Syracusans and forced into exile in Corinth, though he soon landed a small group of Peloponnesian Greeks back on Sicily and founded Kale Akte, where he remained until his death in 440 BC. In the following years Syracuse reconquered almost all the lands he had removed from the Greek sphere of influence.

The Peloponnesian War had broken out in mainland Greece in 431 BC, heavily involving the colonies on Sicily. In 427 BC groups of Siculi became involved again, this time in the war between Leontini and Syracuse. This also drew in Catania, Naxos and Camarina on Leontini's side and Himera and Gela on Syracuse's side. After three years, in 424 BC a peace treaty was signed under the patronage of the Syracusan Hermocrates, who wished to focus on the Athenian troops who had landed on the island and who left as a result of treaty. In 422 BC, a civil war in Leontini provided a fresh pretext for intervention in Syracuse. The city was razed to the ground and the victorious oligarchs moved to Syracuse.

The conflict also drew in western Sicily; in 416 BC Selinunte (with Syracusan support) declared war on Segesta (who had turned to Athens after Carthage refused to help). In 415 BC Athens sent Alcibiades with a fleet of 250 ships and 25,000 men to assist them, but this Sicilian expedition ended in disaster. Later assistance in 414 BC and 413 BC under Demosthenes was still unable to defeat the coalition which had gathered at Syracuse in the meantime. At the end of 413 BC the Athenians were routed, with 7,000 of their men captured and sent to the stone quarries, where most of them died. The rest were sold into slavery and Demosthenes and Nicias were tried. Syracuse celebrated victory, but this could not guarantee internal peace. Its government was led by one of its generals, Diocles of Syracuse, who put in place a series of reforms on the Athenian model and a code of laws. Such a policy was helped by Hermocrates' absence commanding a fleet sent to help Sparta.

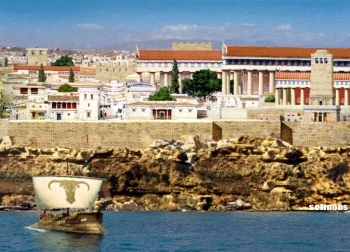
Reconstruction of the acropolis and temples at Selinunte

In 410 BC Selinunte attacked Segesta. A small force of Carthaginian mercenaries came to help Segesta and the following year Hannibal Mago landed with another army, obliterating Selinunte and massacring its inhabitants. He then marched on Himera, where he met the Syracusan army under Diocles. After heavy losses the Syracusans retreated. The Imeresi also fled, but half of them were killed. Hannibal quickly returned to Carthage and demobbed his army. Hermocrates had in the meantime been dismissed from the Aegean fleet and returned with five ships and a small army of refugees and mercenaries, with which he settled in what remained of Selinunte and attacked Carthage's vassal cities. Syracuse fell into chaos, Diocles was exiled and Hermocrates was killed trying to resettle.

In spring 406 BC the Carthaginians returned with a large force, razing Akragas and looting its artworks. A young man named Dionysius was appointed supreme commander of Syracuse, which held out for seven months. Gela and then Kamarina fell, at which point Dionysius was able to sign a peace treaty delimiting Syracuse's and Carthage's spheres of influence on the island, leaving the Punic, Sicanian and Elymian cities in the latter. It also imposed a tribute to Carthage on Selinunte, Akragas, Himera, Gela and Camarina and forbade them to build city walls, but Leontini, Messina and the Siculi were freed and Dionysius was left in control of Syracuse. Thus ended the brief period of democracy. The period from 405 BC right up to the conquest by Rome would be marked by the rulers of Syracuse.

=== Dionysius I of Syracuse ===
Dionysius I of Syracuse took power by stages and reigned over the whole of Sicily as far as Solunto, extending his influence as far as the bay of Taranto and into Etruscan territory. He attacked and destroyed the port of Pyrgi (now Santa Severa) and sacked Cerveteri in a 384 BC campaign. As early as 404 BC he renounced Syracuse's treaty with Carthage and began to take over several Siculan colonies, pushing as far as Enna. He then attacked and destroyed Naxos and conquered Catania, deporting its inhabitants. He strengthened his army, adopting new weapons such as catapults and building a powerful fleet by deforesting large areas of Etna.

He declared open war on Carthage in 398 BC. Erice surrendered and after a year's siege Motia was destroyed and its inhabitants slaughtered. In 396 BC the Carthaginians returned to Sicily in force, taking almost the whole island, destroying Messina and menacing Syracuse itself before a plague forced them to make peace with Dionysius, pay him a large indemnity and return to Carthage. Messina was repopulated and Dionysius fought with Carthage again, with varying degrees of success, until his death in 367 BC.

Around 387 BC Dionysius began to establish colonies on the Adriatic coast to obtain wheat from the Po Valley without it having to cross Etruscan territory. He also agreed to populate the new colonies with his pro-democratic political opponents and let them set up democratic governments there. This marked the foundation of Adrìa (now Adria), Ankón (now Ancona), Issa (now Vis), Dimos (now Hvar), Pharos (now Stari Grad) and Tragyrion (now Traù).

Dionysius was succeeded by his son Dionysius the Younger, but he was less able than his father and aroused hostility from a faction led by Dion of Syracuse, the brother of his father's Syracusan wife. Dion was exiled in 367 BC but ten years later took 1,000 mercenaries to Minoa to request its assistance. He then marched on Syracuse, which quickly opened its gates and welcomed him, leading to a decade of struggles which drew in Leontini and the other cities and ended with Syracusan control of Sicily weakened. Syracuse was also convulsed by a series of murders, whilst Callipus became tyrant of Catania and Hicetas of Leontini. According to Plutarch, Plato was also caught up in this period.

=== Timoleon ===
In 346 BC Dionysius the Younger returned to Syracuse, though sources on the period are fragmentary. Meanwhile Troina may have taken Leptines's power in Apollonia and Eugione, Mamercus was based in Catania, Nicodemus in Centuripe, Apolloniadas in Agirio, Hippon in Zancle and Andromacus in Taormina.

Political disorder led to a precarious balance. Exiled to Leontini, Iceta sought assistance from Corinth, which sent a small army under Timoleon, landing at Taormina in 344 BC and in six years taking the whole of Sicily and removing all the tyrants, almost all of whom were killed, except his friend Andromacus of Taormina. In 339 BC he routed the Carthaginians at the river Crimiso (possibly the river Caldo, a tributary of the S.Bartolomeo near Segesta) and seized immense amounts of booty. Later that year, old and possibly blind, he retired. According to Diodorus and Plutarch he had restored democracy to Syracuse, even if real power remained in the hands of the Council of Six Hundred. Syracuse and Sicily thus began a new period of prosperity and redevelopment, with Akragas, Gela, the hinterlands, Kamarina, Megara Hyblea, Segesta and Morgantina all flourishing again.

=== Hellenistic era (323 BC-) ===
==== Agathocles ====
Timoleon's retirement from politics soon led to another period of instability, mainly marked by internal class conflict between the oligarchs and the people of Syracuse. Wars broke out between the cities, paving the way for the long reign of Agathocles from 317 BC. He played a major part in these wars. The long period of autonomy and self-government for the cities in mainland Greece and Sicily thus ended and the Hellenistic monarchies were born.

Agathocles seized power in Sicily with the aid of veterans from Morgantina and other cities in the interior during two days of popular revolts. According to Diodorus Siculus, 4,000 high-ranking people were killed and 6,000 more exiled. In the end Agathocles was elected sole commander with full powers. Like all demagogues of this period he promised the cancellation of debts and the division and distribution of land, promises which it seems from the limited sources that he kept. According to Polybius, the cruel actions attributed to him were limited to his early days and were solely directed at the oligarchic class and never towards the general population.

Sicily began to prosper again, though Agathocles' first decade was marked by conflicts with the oligarchies of Akragas, Gela and Messina, backed by Carthage which in 311 BC invaded Sicily again. Besieged in Syracuse, in mid-August 310 BC Agathocles entrusted the city's defence to his brother Antandros and escaped with 14,000 men and 60 ships to invade North Africa. He burned his ships after arriving and based himself in Tunis, directly threatening Carthage itself. Forced to send some of his force back from Sicily to defend his homeland, Hamilcar Barca suffered a humiliating defeat after which he was captured, tortured to death and beheaded, with his head sent to Agathocles in Africa. However, Agathocles did not have enough troops to launch an attack on Carthage and so allied himself with Alexander the Great's old officer Ofella, governor of Cyrenaica, who had 10,000 elephants and cavalry at his disposal. Agathocles then murdered Ofella for unknown reasons and took command of the extra forces himself, taking Utica, Hippon Akra and a major naval force with its shipyards and bases. He was still unable to take Carthage itself, however, and news of revolts on Sicily in 307 BC forced him to return there for a time. He then returned to Africa, but his depleted resources and his troops' low morale led him to sue for peace in 306 BC. The settlement left Carthage with Eraclea Minoa, Termini, Solunto, Selinunte and Segesta, but forced it to give up its expansionist aims on Sicily.

It was at this point that Agathocles adopted the Hellenistic-style title of king of Sicily, though this was mainly for a foreign audience, with his style of rule on Sicily remaining unchanged. He turned his ambitions east towards Italy and the outlying Greek islands, conquering Lefkada and Corcyra, the latter given as a dowry when he married off his daughter to Pyrrhus of Epirus. Agathocles then married for a third time, this time to a daughter of Ptolemy I. During his long reign Sicily prospered, as is confirmed by the archaeological record. He was murdered by a family rival in 289 BC, aged 72, but his death quickly led to anarchy and power struggles.

One of those power struggles was between the Syracusans and a group of Italic mercenaries known as the Mamertines. To convince the mercenaries to leave the city, the Syracusans offered them the port of Messina, which the mercenaries seized, massacring the men and enslaving the women and children. The mercenaries then began raids on the area and also attacked Gela and Camarina. In 282 BC, Phintias tyrant of Akragas took advantage of this and finally destroyed Gela and deported its population to Licata, which he rebuilt in pure Greek style with a city wall, temples and agora. Two years later Syracuse attacked and defeated Akragas, raiding the territory but also triggering a new Carthaginian invasion.

==== Pyrrhic War ====
At this point Pyrrhus of Epirus (fresh from his eponymous 'Pyrrhic victory' against the Romans at Taranto) replied to Sicilian Greek cities' appeal for assistance, landing at Taormina in 278 BC, welcomed by the tyrant Tyndarion. His large army and 200 ships succeeded in neutralising both the Carthaginian and Mamertine threats, but he was unable to take the Carthaginian stronghold at Lilybaeum and soon had to return to Italy.

==== Hiero II ====
In 269 BC Hiero took power in Syracuse, made a treaty with the Carthaginians and launched a new attack on the Mamertines. However, Carthage was wary of letting Syracuse's power from growing too great and thus forbade Hiero from taking Messina. Hiero's next step was to proclaim himself king and he remained so until his death in 215 BC. He built a fortified palace on Ortygia and governed differently from previous sovereigns. From then on he pursued a non-expansionist policy, eschewing military adventures in favour of a focus on trade in the Mediterranean, especially with Ptolemaic Egypt. Concluding the Roman Republic would soon eclipse Carthage, he made a treaty with the Republic in 263 BC and remained faithful to it until his death, sparing his subjects the consequences of the First Punic War. In fact for some years Roman troops had severely damaged the cities in western Sicily.

== Today ==
The city of Messina is home to a small Greek-speaking minority, which arrived from the Peloponnese between 1533 and 1534 when fleeing the expansion of the Ottoman Empire. They were officially recognised in 2012.

== Bibliography ==
- (in Italian) "Laura Buccino, 'I caratteri generali della colonizzazione greca in Occidente', in Il Mondo dell'Archeologia, Roma, Istituto dell'Enciclopedia Italiana, 2004".
- (in Italian) Moses I. Finley, Storia della Sicilia antica, 8ª ed., Bari-Roma, Laterza Editore, 2009 [1979], ISBN 978-88-420-2532-0.
- (in Italian) Francesco Alaimo, La leggenda di Akragas, Firenze, Lalli Editore, 1991, ISBN 0-00-099013-2.
- (in Italian) AA.VV., I greci in Occidente: Magna Grecia e Sicilia, Milano, Rcs MediaGroup, 1996.
- (in Italian) AA.VV., I Greci in Occidente. Catalogo della Mostra (Palazzo Grassi, Venezia 1996), curated by Giovanni Pugliese Carratelli, 2ª ed., Milano, Bompiani, 1996, ISBN 88-452-2798-7.
- (in Italian) Gioacchino Francesco La Torre, Sicilia e Magna Grecia. Archeologia della colonizzazione greca d'Occidente, Bari-Roma, Laterza Editore, 2011, ISBN 978-88-420-9511-8.
- (in Italian) Martin Dreher, La Sicilia antica, Bologna, il Mulino, 2010, ISBN 978-88-15-13824-8.
- Claire L. Lyons, Michael Bennett, Clemente Marconi (ed.s), Sicily: Art and Invention between Greece and Rome, Getty Publications, 2013, ISBN 978-1-60606-133-6.
- (in Italian) Valerio Massimo Manfredi and Lorenzo Braccesi, I Greci d'occidente, Milano, Arnoldo Mondadori Editore, 1997, ISBN 88-04-43503-8.
- (in Italian) Dieter Mertens and Margareta Schützenberger, Città e monumenti dei greci d'occidente: dalla colonizzazione alla crisi di fine V secolo a.C., Roma, L'Erma di Bretschneider, 2006, ISBN 978-88-8265-933-2.
- (in Italian) Indro Montanelli, Storia dei Greci, Milano, Rizzoli, 2005, ISBN 88-17-11512-6.
- (in Italian) Jean Huré, Storia della Sicilia, San Giovanni La Punta (CT), Brancato Editore, 2005, ISBN 88-8031-078-X.
- (in Italian) Santi Correnti, Breve storia della Sicilia dalle origini ai giorni nostri, Roma, Newton & Compton, 2002 [1996], ISBN 88-7983-511-4.
- (in Italian) Francesco Benigno and Giuseppe Giarrizzo, Storia della Sicilia, vol. 1, ed. Laterza, Roma-Bari, 1999, ISBN 88-421-0533-3
- (in Italian) Lorenzo Braccesi and Giovanni Millino, La Sicilia greca, Carocci editore, Roma, 2000, ISBN 88-430-1702-0
- (in Italian) C. Soraci, La Sicilia romana, Carocci editore, Roma, 2016, ISBN 97-88-8430-8226-1.
