= Libyan-Punic Infantry =

Libyco-Punic infantry
- Active: From the 5th century BC
- Country: Carthage; Sicily; Hadrumetum
- Allegiance: Carthage
- Type: Mercenary infantry
- Part of: Carthaginian army
- Engagements: Punic Wars; Battle of Lake Trasimene

The Roman historian Livy described the Libyco-Punic infantry as mixtum Punicum Afris genus, probably taking Polybius as his source. They formed the most loyal and capable force of the Carthaginian army. By this expression, Livy meant "a Punic race mixed with Africans". The Libyco-Punics are described as people of mixed culture, half Punic and half African. A blend of Libyan and Punic culture, they lived in the Carthaginian territory in Africa, such as Utica or Hadrumetum.

== History ==
Around the 5th century BC, Libyco-Punics began to be found in other Carthaginian settlements around the Mediterranean, such as in the Iberian Peninsula and Sicily, where they were used to increase the population in Carthaginian colonies. The Libyco-Punic population shared many features and traits with the citizens of Carthage, but they did not have the same rights.

The Libyco-Punics were present in all the major battles of the Punic Wars. They fought against the Romans, the Libyans, the Italic peoples, the Greeks and the Iberians. By the 3rd century BC, the Libyco-Punics were the only ethnic group under Carthaginian rule that was legally obliged to provide soldiers for the metropolis. Once recruited, however, there is evidence that they received a salary as generous as that of mercenary troops. Polybius states that they formed the core of the cavalry, as well as providing infantry troops.

Before the First Punic War, the Libyco-Punics were equipped with iron helmets and cuirasses. They carried large white shields that protected most of their bodies, and they marched in a slow and ordered formation (most likely similar to the Macedonian phalanx).

At the start of the war, they are described as being equipped in a late hoplite fashion, like Ancient Greek mercenaries. They wore a metal helmet, a linen cuirass, round shields and long spears similar to the sarissa, as well as short swords.

They also used, on other occasions, the armor taken from Roman Principes and Hastati, especially after Hannibal Barca’s victory at the Battle of Lake Trasimene in 217 BC; they completed this equipment with Thracian helmets or those taken from the enemy, and a short spear or javelin (longche), from which their name longchoporoi derived.

When Hannibal was about to invade Italy, he left in Hispania 450 cavalry and 11,850 infantry Libyphoenicians under the command of his brother Hasdrubal.

== Equipment ==
Although armed with the traditional hoplite shield and spear like other Carthaginian troops, these elite warriors were equipped with a metal cuirass, and a short sword as a secondary weapon for close combat. They were very versatile, but their heavy armor and weapons allowed them in battle to defeat even the boldest adversaries.

They were armed and protected much like their Greek enemies in Greek Sicily. They had the traditional round shield of the Greek hoplite, but with greater use of spears. The spearmen were equipped in a similar way to the Greek hoplites. This equipment consisted of a heavy spear 5 to 7 m in length, with iron point and butt, handled with both hands. In addition, they carried a long sword for close combat and a round shield 60 cm in diameter and concave in shape, designed to be worn on the arm, with a grip (antilabe) at one end and a strap (telamon) that allowed it to be carried easily and fixed more firmly during a charge. They had a quality phalanx, capable of resisting both the Romans and their Greek counterparts. These Libyco-Punics were also armed with chain mail, which allowed them to serve as a heavy infantry phalanx. In addition, their formation improved thanks to Greek and Phoenician advisers.

The shields of the Carthaginian phalanx were generally painted white. The most characteristic decorative motifs were the star, the palm tree or the horse, symbols of the city of Carthage, as shown by their coins. These same shields are described by Mamercus, tyrant of Catania, after he had obtained them from some of Timoleon’s Greek mercenaries: "These shields dyed in purple, inlaid with gold, marble and coral, we took with the help of poor shields, small and worthless".
