= Constantino Cajetan =

Benedictine scholar

- Born: 1568; Syracuse, Kingdom of Sicily
- Died: 7 September 1650 (aged 81–82); Rome, Papal States
- Resting place: San Benedetto in Piscinula
- Occupation: Religious, scholar, historian
- Family: Ottavio Gaetani

Constantino Cajetan (1560 in Syracuse, Sicily – 17 September 1650 in Rome) was a Benedictine scholar.

== Life ==
Although his brothers, Ottavio and Alfonso, joined the Society of Jesus, Constantino became a Benedictine (29 October 1586) at San Nicolò d'Arena in Catania. He was soon called to Rome by Pope Clement VIII, who confided to the promising young scholar an edition of the works of St. Peter Damian, which he executed in four folio volumes (Rome, 1606 et saep.). His constant and successful researches in Roman archives won him the friendship of Cardinal Baronius, through whom he was made titular Abbot of San Baronzio in the Diocese of Pistoia, and custodian of the Vatican Library. The latter important office he held under four popes until his death. Baronius was indebted to him in the composition of his Annales Ecclesiastici, and praised Cajetan's knowledge of the Roman archives.

== Works ==
He wrote on ecclesiastical history; the long list of his writings may be seen in Magnoald Ziegelbauer. Among them are a life of the liturgist, St. Amalarius of Trier (Rome, 1612), annotated lives of St. Isadore of Seville, St. Ildephoses of Toledo, Cardinal Gregory of Ostia, notes on the life of St. Anselm, an annotated edition of the Vita Gelasii II by Pandolfo of Pisa, treatises on the primacy and the Roman episcopate of St. Peter. He was persuaded that St. Gregory the Great was a genuine disciple of St. Benedict, and wrote in defense of this thesis De S. Gregorii monachatu benedictino libri duo (Salzburg, 1620). The authorship of the Imitation of Christ interested him also, and he several times supported the Benedictine Jean Gerson.

His ardor for the glory of the Benedictine Order troubled his judgment occasionally, says Father Hurter, e.g. when he claimed for it such persons as St. Columbanus of Bobbio, St. Thomas Aquinas, St. Francis of Assisi, St. Ignatius Loyola. He inaugurated the controversy concerning the authorship of the work known as the Spiritual Exercises of St. Ignatius by his book De religiosâ S. Ignatii, sive S. Enneconis fundatoris soc. Jesu per Benedictinos institutione, deque libello exercitiorum ejusdem ab Exercitatorio Cisnerii desumpto (Venice, 1641), in which he claimed priority for the Exercitatorium Spirituale of Garcias de Cisneros, Benedictine Abbot of Santa Maria de Montserrat (1455–1510). Both this work and the Achates, or reply of Giovanni Rho, S.J., were placed on the Index of Forbidden Books in 1646.

== Legacy ==
Cajetan was a collector of books, and at his death left his fortune to the Bibliotheca Aniciana, founded by him in honor of the family of St. Gregory the Great (Gens Anicia); the books have since been divided between the Propaganda Library and that of the Sapienza, or Roman University. To many his chief title to fame will rest on his claim to be considered the first promoter, if not the founder, of the Propaganda College at Rome. He had long hoped to found at Rome a Collegium Gregorianum de propagandâ fide, in which young Benedictines might be trained for foreign missions, after the spirit and teachings of St. Gregory the Great, Apostle of the Anglo-Saxons. He really opened a house of studies for this purpose in the monastery of San Benedetto in Piscinula at Rome, and this may be looked on as historically the germ of Propaganda. His idea was taken up seriously by Pope Gregory XV (1621–23), who enlarged and modified until it took shape as the "Collegium [later Urbanum] de propagandâ fide". The pioneer labors of Cajetan received due recognition by his nomination as first consultor of the new college.
