= Motya Charioteer =

Marble statue from the Classical Period

Mozia Charioteer
- Motya Charioteer
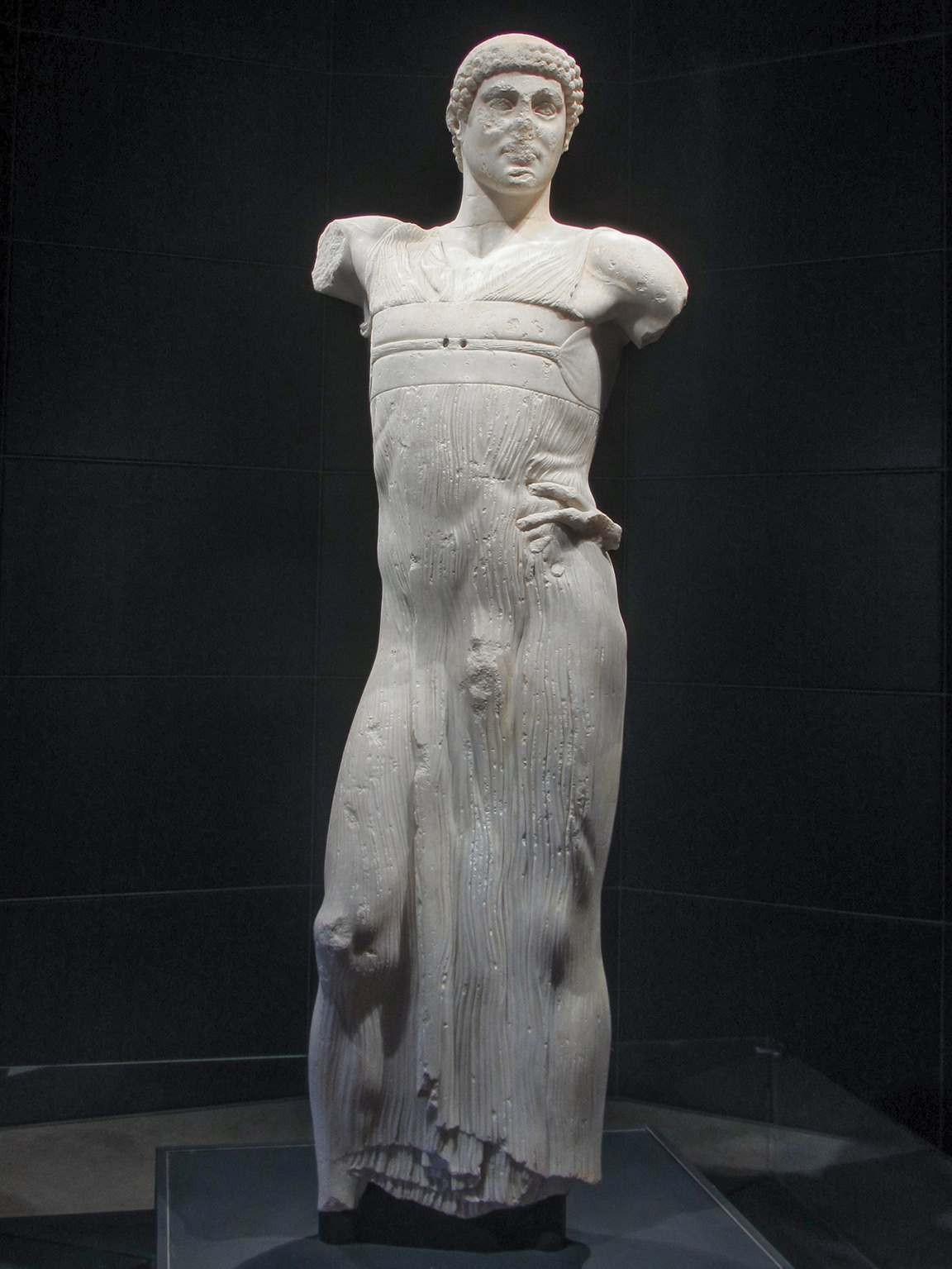
- Year: 470–460 BC
- Medium: marble
- Dimensions: 181 cm × 40 cm (71 in × 16 in)
- Location: Museo Giuseppe Whitaker, Mozia

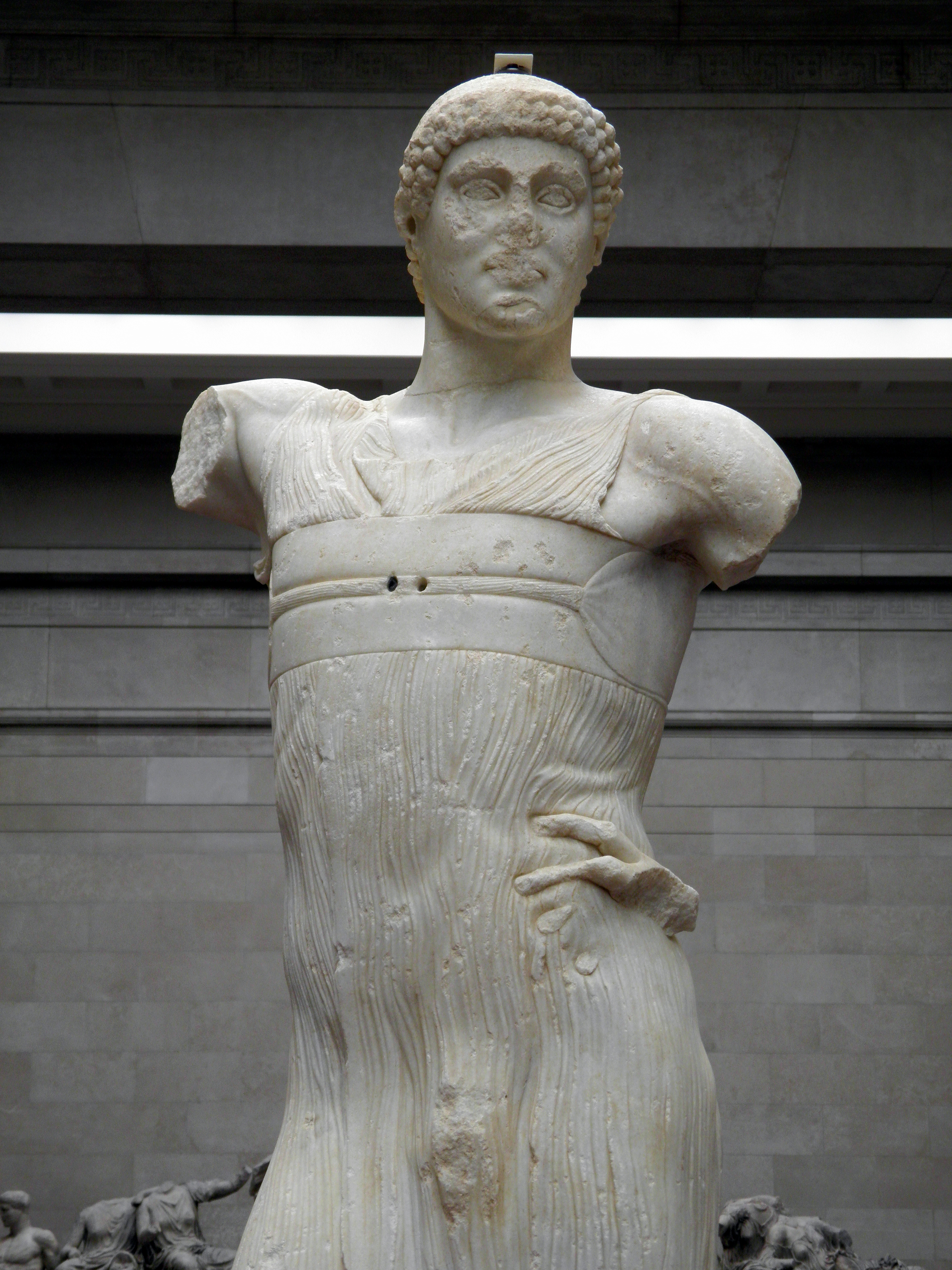
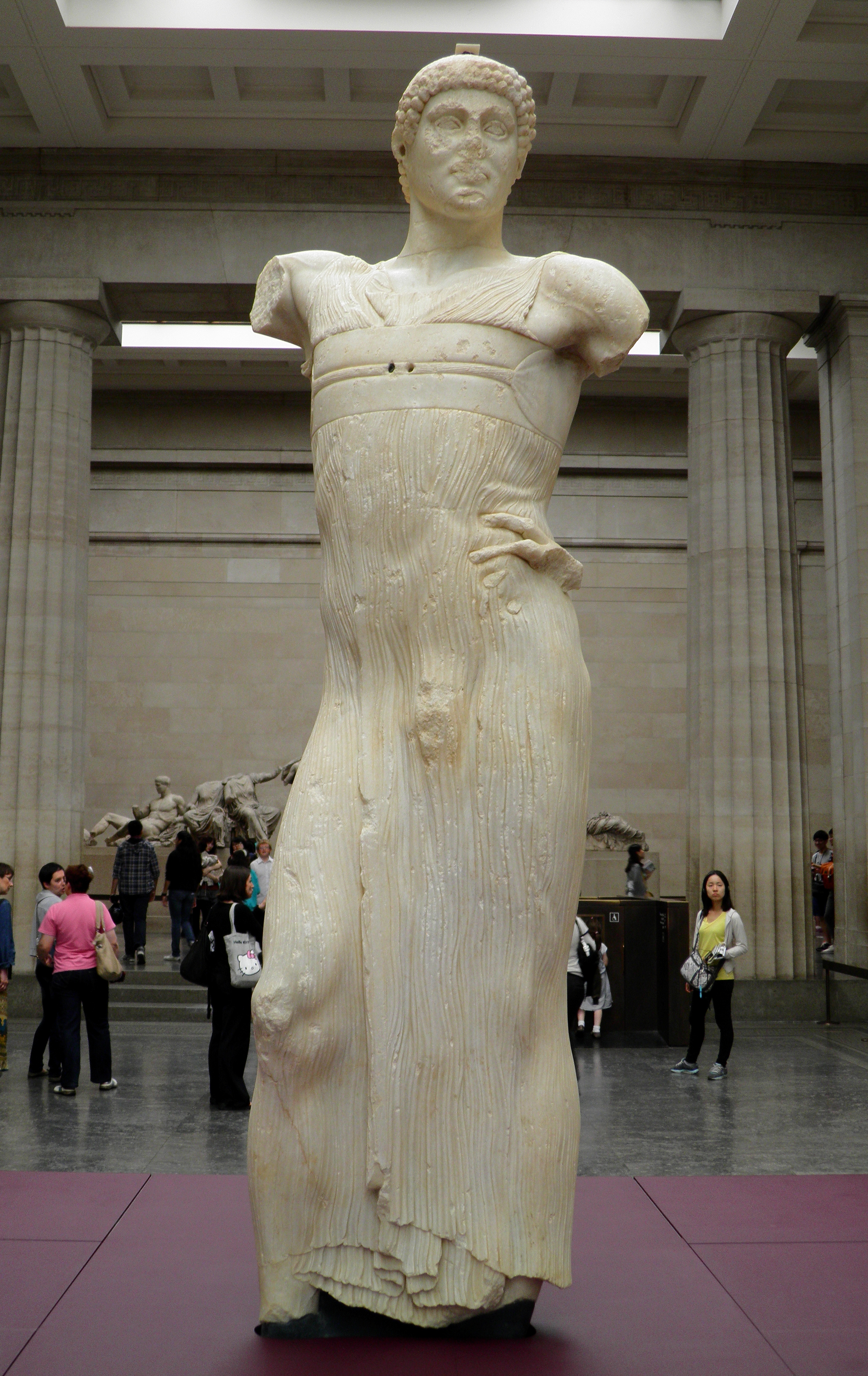
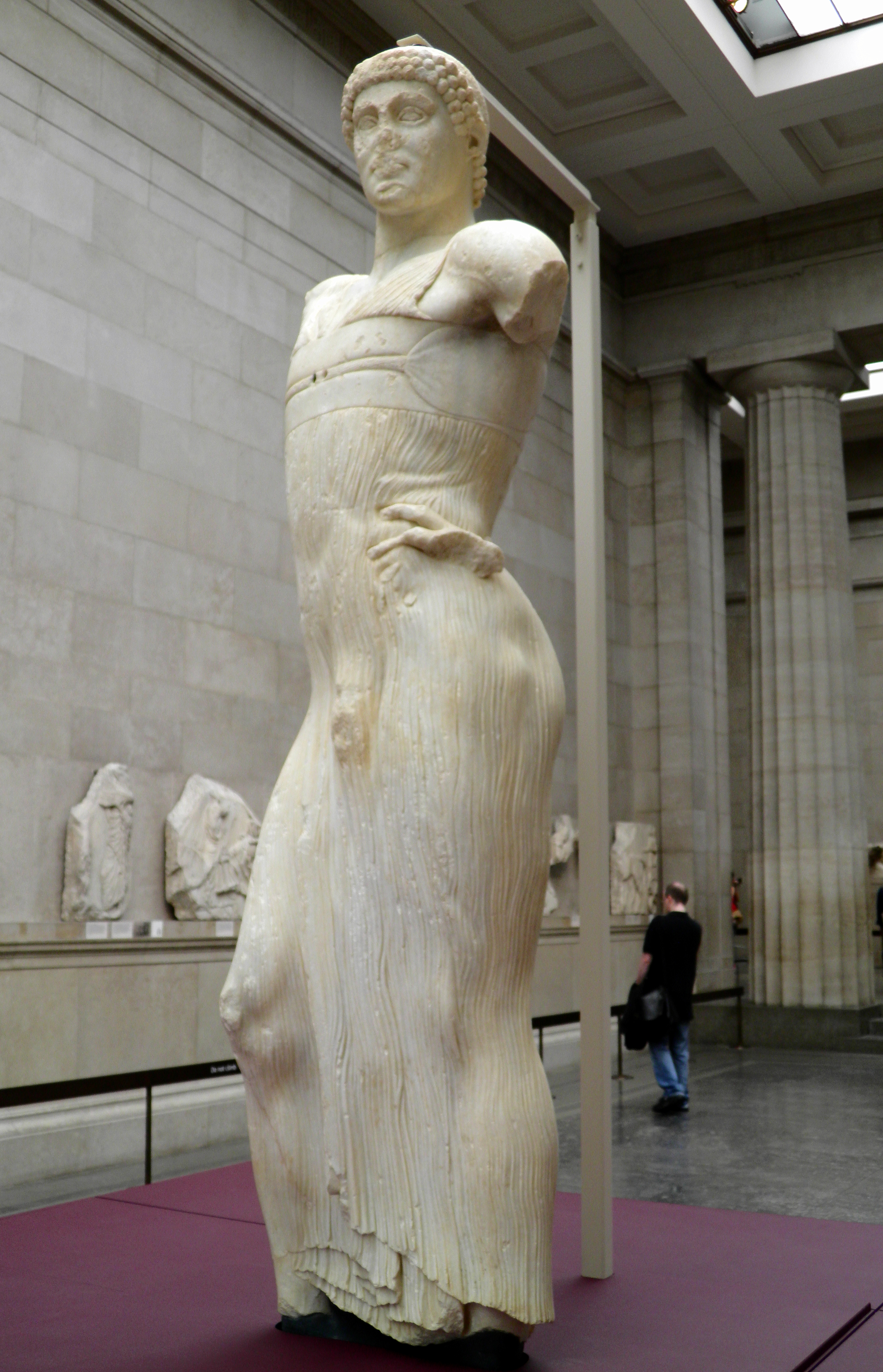
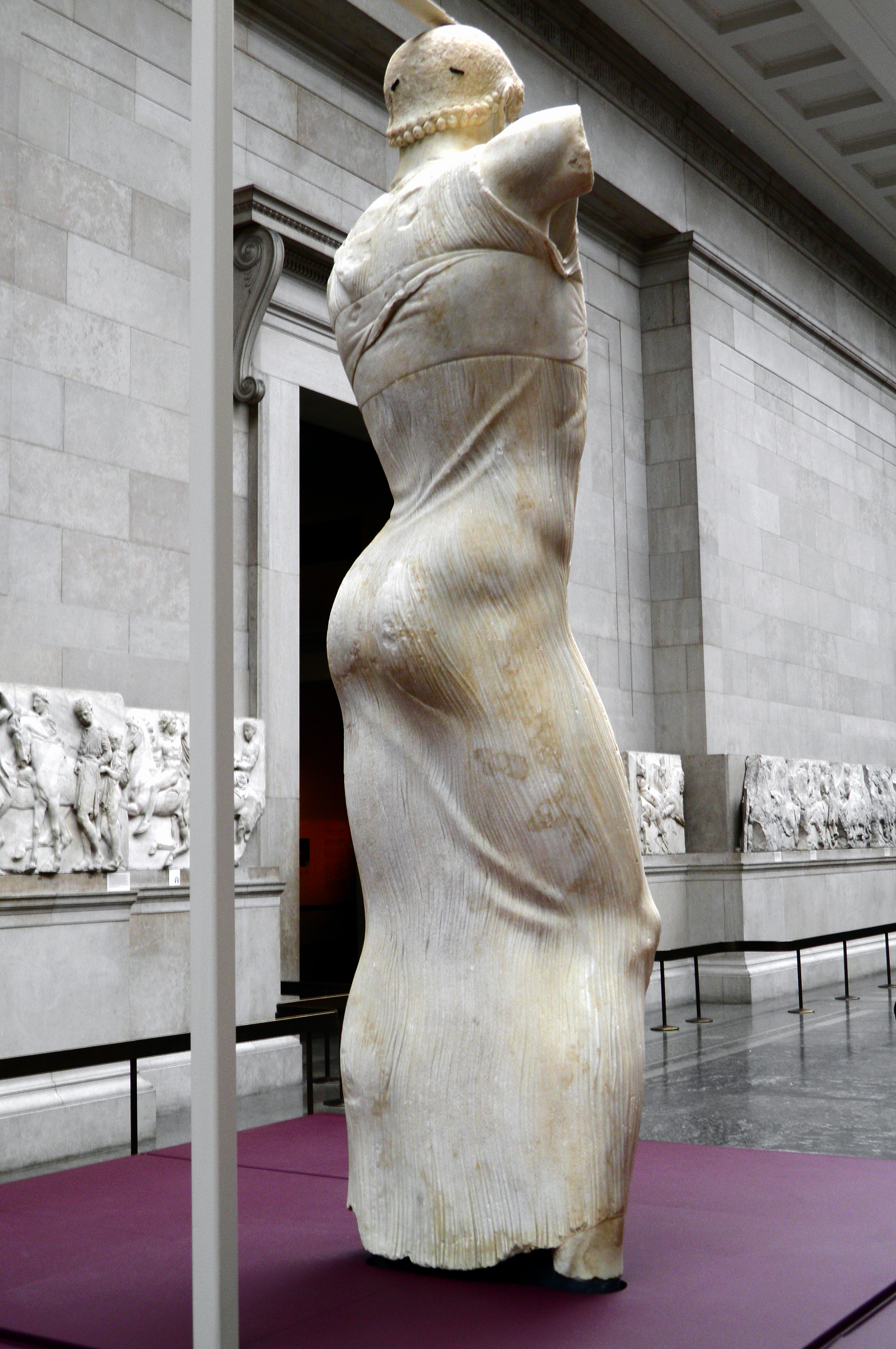
Made by a Greek sculptor in Sicily about 460-450 BC, found in 1979 on the Sicilian island of Motya (Mozia), and displayed at the British Museum in 2012.

The Motya (or Mozia) Charioteer is a marble statue dating from the ancient Greek Classical Period. It was found in October 1979 in the ancient city of Motya (Italian: Mozia), originally a Phoenician settlement which occupied the island of San Pantaleo off the coast of Sicily. It is owned by, and on view in, the Museo Giuseppe Whitaker (inv. no. 4310) on the same island.

== Description ==
The marble statue depicts a young male figure in a swinging contraposto pose, with his right foot forward, his left hand resting on his hip, and his right arm raised. He wears a very long chiton, with a broad flat belt over his chest. Two holes once accommodated a metal fitting at the centre of the belt, perhaps a clasp. The figure's musculature, genitals, and posterior are clearly visible; the sculptor managed to create the illusion that they are seen through the sheer fabric of the chiton. Bulging veins are depicted on the upper arms in a rudimentary manner. The figure's face is impassive, with puffy eyelids and almond-shaped eyes. The hair is depicted as three rows of circles, commonly known as "snail curls." Above them, the head is a featureless dome. There are small holes around the bottom of the dome, which were probably for pins to secure a metal skull cap or helmet.

When the sculpture was toppled in antiquity, both arms were snapped off and lost, as were the legs below the shins. The face is also heavily damaged and the head was snapped off at the neck, but it has been reattached by archaeologists.

=== Dating ===
The charioteer was found in a stratigraphic layer associated with the destruction of Motya in 397 BC, which provides a terminus ante quem. Several stylistic features make clear that it dates from the 470s BC and is an early example of Classical sculpture. This early date is suggested by the depiction of the hair with rows of snail curls, which is typical of Archaic Greek sculpture, as well as the bulging veins. Such veins were first depicted in sculpture by Pythagoras of Rhegium ca. 480-470 BC, suggesting a date around this time. Moreover, the facial features are similar to those of the figures in the pedimental sculpture of the Temple of Zeus at Olympia, which dates to the 460s BC.

=== Subject ===
The subject of the statue is heavily disputed. It clearly belongs within the Greek sculptural tradition, but Motya was a Punic settlement. Which of these two factors should be given preeminence in interpreting the statue is an open question.

Scholars who foreground the Punic context of the sculpture have seen it as depicting a Punic priest. In this interpretation, the belt around the figure's chest is compared to a piece of priestly regalia seen in depictions of priests in Punic art. Some go further and see the sculpture specifically as a depiction of Hamilcar I of Carthage, who led the invasion of Sicily that culminated in the Battle of Himera in 480 BC, and is depicted as a priest in Greek literary sources.

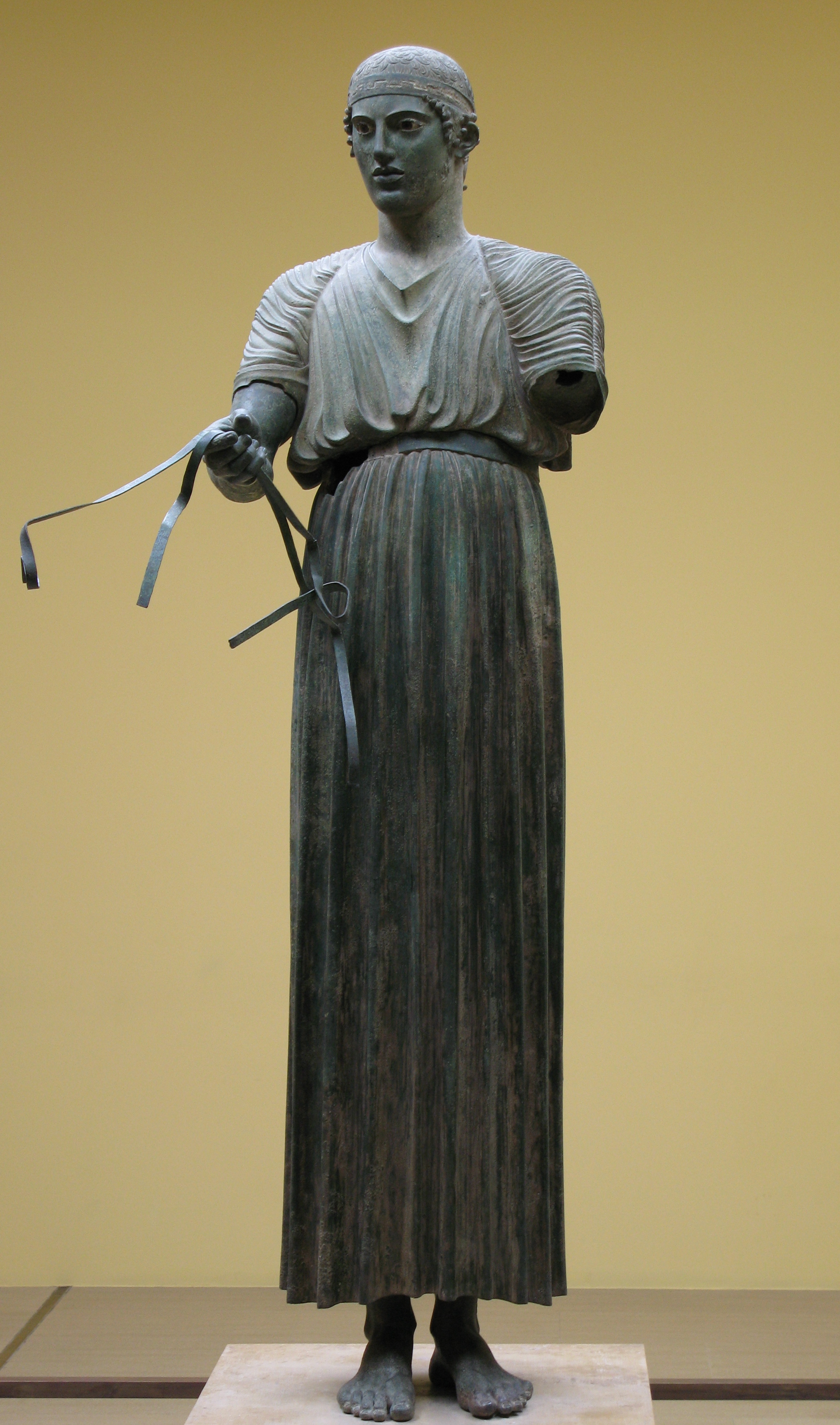
Image of the Charioteer of Delphi

Scholars such as R. R. R. Smith, who emphasise the Greek artistic context, interpret the sculpture as a depiction of a charioteer celebrating a victory in one of the Panhellenic Games. On this interpretation, the chiton and belt are the chiton poderos or xystis, the traditional costume worn by charioteers – to be compared with that worn by the Charioteer of Delphi. One objection to this interpretation is the starkly different postures of the Motya Charioteer and the Charioteer of Delphi. However, Smith argues that this difference reflects the divergent status of the two charioteers. Usually, the owners of chariots entered in the Panhellenic Games did not drive their own chariots, instead employing professional drivers. Sculptural groups commemorating victories commonly depicted the charioteer, but presented him in an impassive guise and focused attention on a figure of the victorious owner. Some chariots, however, were driven by their owners; examples include Herodotus of Thebes and Thrasybulus of Acragas. In that case, the victorious owner and the charioteer would be one and the same. Smith proposes that the Motya sculpture depicts an owner-charioteer of this type, arguing that "the swaggering whole embodied agonistic arete as conceived in the early fifth century BC."

Scholars who favour this latter interpretation have tended to explain the charioteer's presence in the Punic settlement of Motya by regarding it as war booty seized from one of the Sicilian Greek centres destroyed in the Carthaginian invasion of Sicily in 410–404 BC. R. R. R. Smith argues that this explanation may not be necessary, given the large Greek population resident in Motya as well as the familiarity of the Punic inhabitants of Motya with Greek culture.

== Discovery and archaeological context ==
The Motya Charioteer was discovered in 1979 in the northeast sector of the island of Motya, while archeologists were excavating an open area between an ancient potters' workshop and a sanctuary. The area was filled with rubble and dirt that may have once formed barricades erected during Dionysius I of Syracuse's siege of Motya in 397 BC. The statue was found lying on its back with its head detached and resting in place, suggesting that the weight of the soil that had buried the statue was responsible for its decapitation. The arms, metal accessories, and base of the statue were not found at the site and remain missing; therefore, it is likely that the statue was not found in its original context. It is possible that the statue was originally displayed in the nearby sanctuary and was knocked down during the Syracusan siege.

== Sources ==
- Sicily: Art and Invention between Greece and Rome. Los Angeles: The J. Paul Getty Museum. 2013.
- Bell, Malcolm (1995). "The Motya Charioteer and Pindar's "Isthmian 2"". Memoirs of the American Academy in Rome. 40: 1–42. doi:10.2307/4238727. JSTOR 4238727.
- Falsone, G. (1986). "La scoperta, lo scavo e il contesto archeologico". La statua marmorea di Mozia. pp. 9–29.
- Papadopoulos, J. (2014). "The Motya Youth: Apollo Karneios, Art and Tyranny in the Greek West." Art Bulletin.
- Smith, R. R. R. (2007). Hornblower, Simon; Morgan, Catherine (eds.). Pindar's poetry, patrons, and festivals : from archaic Greece to the Roman Empire. Oxford: Oxford University Press. pp. 130-135. ISBN 9780199296729.
- Stampolidis, N. (2004). Magna Graecia: Athletics and the Olympic Spirit on the Periphery of the Hellenic World. Athens. pp. 34–38.
