= Motya =

Ancient city on San Pantaleo Island, Italy

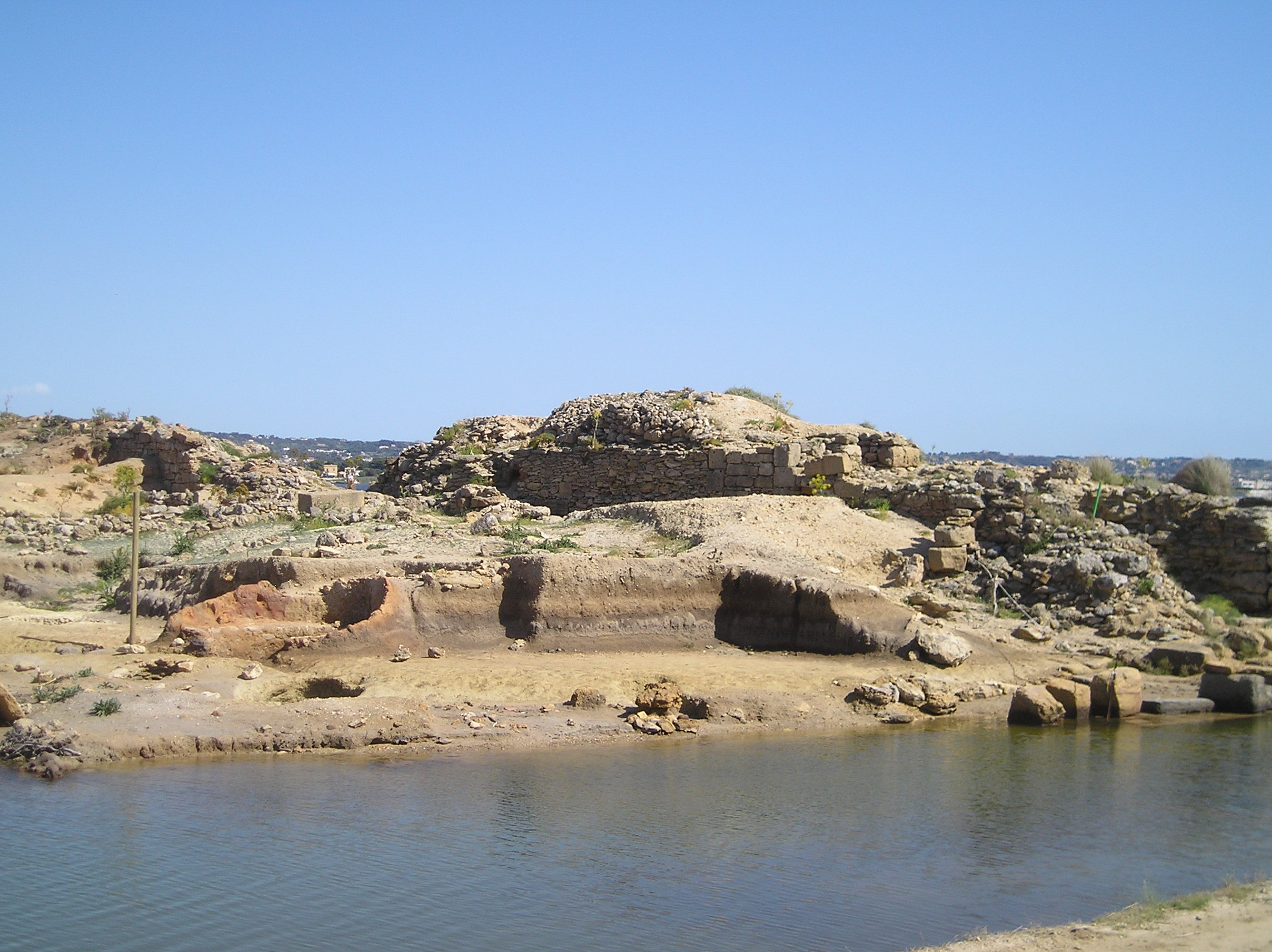
- Motya

- Location within Sicily Location within Italy
- 37°52′06″N 12°28′07″E
- Type: Settlement
- Location: Marsala, Sicily, Italy

Site notes
- Condition: In ruins

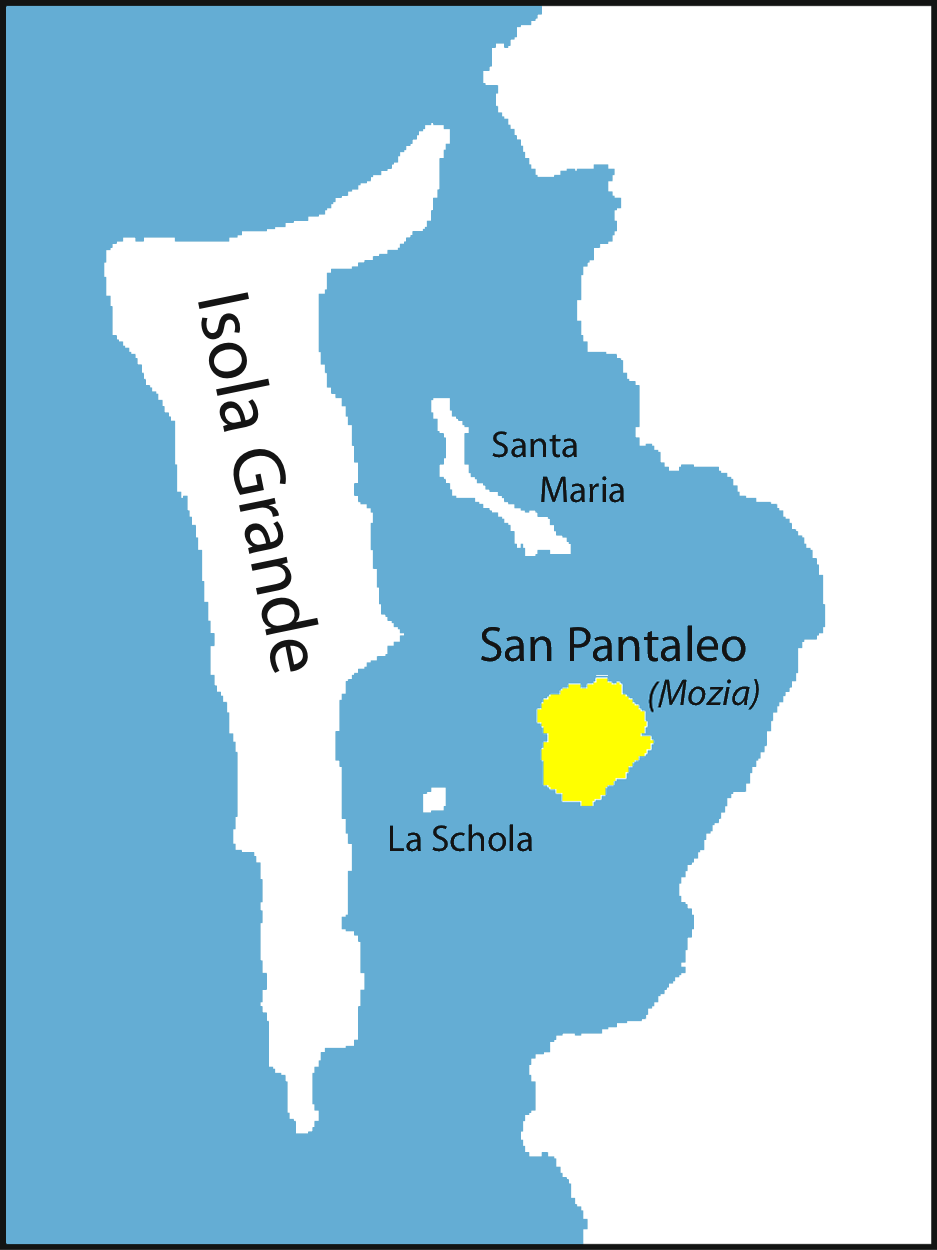
Position of Motya

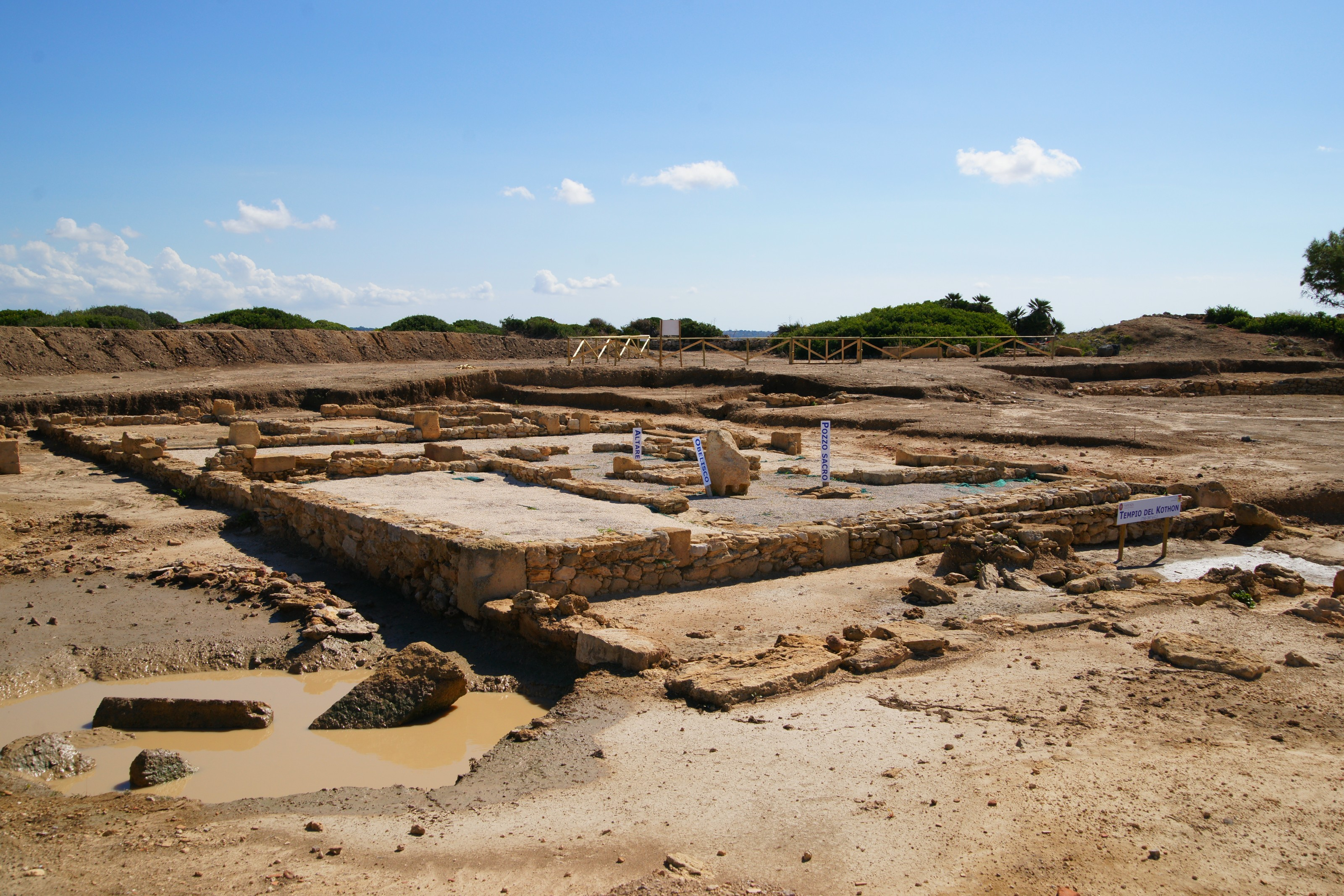
Temple of Baal

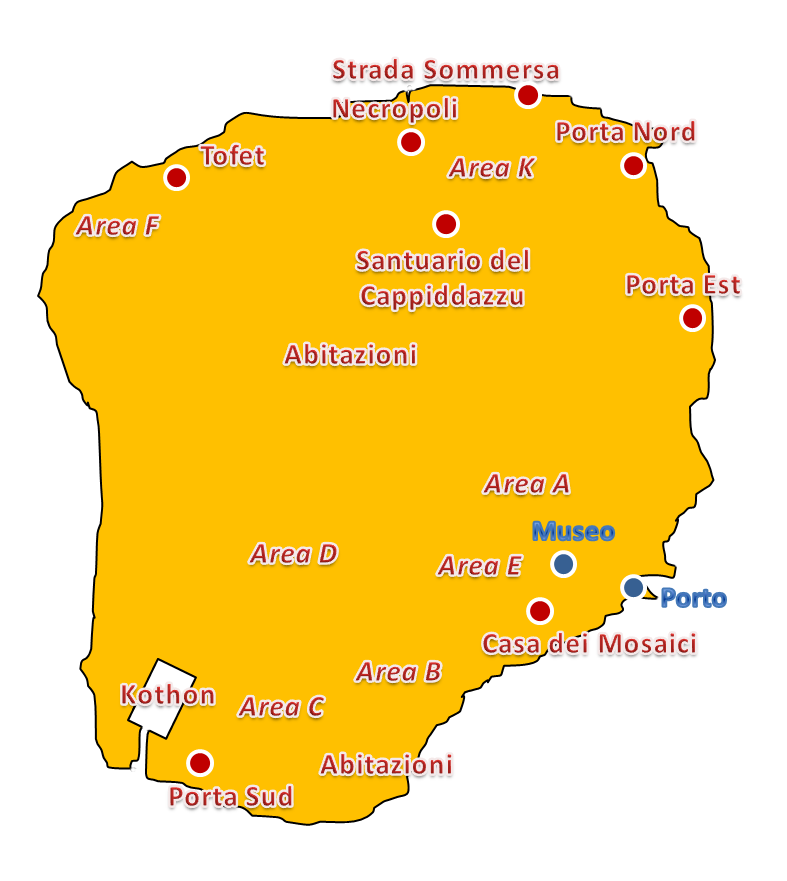
Plan and sites of Motya island

Motya was an ancient and powerful city on San Pantaleo Island off the west coast of Sicily, in the Stagnone Lagoon between Drepanum (modern Trapani) and Lilybaeum (modern Marsala). It is within the present-day commune of Marsala, Italy.

Many of the city's ancient monuments have been excavated and are visible today. Motya has become known for the marble statue of the Motya Charioteer, found in 1979 and on display at the local Giuseppe Whitaker museum.

== Names ==
Motya is the latinization of the island's Greek name, variously written Motýa (Μοτύα) or Motýē (Μοτύη). In Punic, the name is attested on coins as ʾmṭw (𐤀𐤌𐤈𐤅), mṭwʾ (𐤌𐤈𐤅𐤀), or hmṭwʾ (𐤄𐤌𐤈𐤅𐤀), the last of which includes the definite article h- (𐤄). From these attestations, the pronunciation has been approximated as Motúwa, or similar.

The origin of the name is uncertain. One proposed Semitic derivation associates it with spinning or weaving, yielding interpretations such as “spinners’ town” or “the weaving mill”; a non-Semitic origin, possibly Sicanian or Elymian, has also been suggested.

The Greeks claimed the place was named for a woman named Motya whom they connected with the myths around Hercules. The town's Italian name appears as both Mozia and Mothia; its Sicilian name is Mozzia.

The island first received the name San Pantaleo in the 11th century from Basilian monks.

== Location and site ==
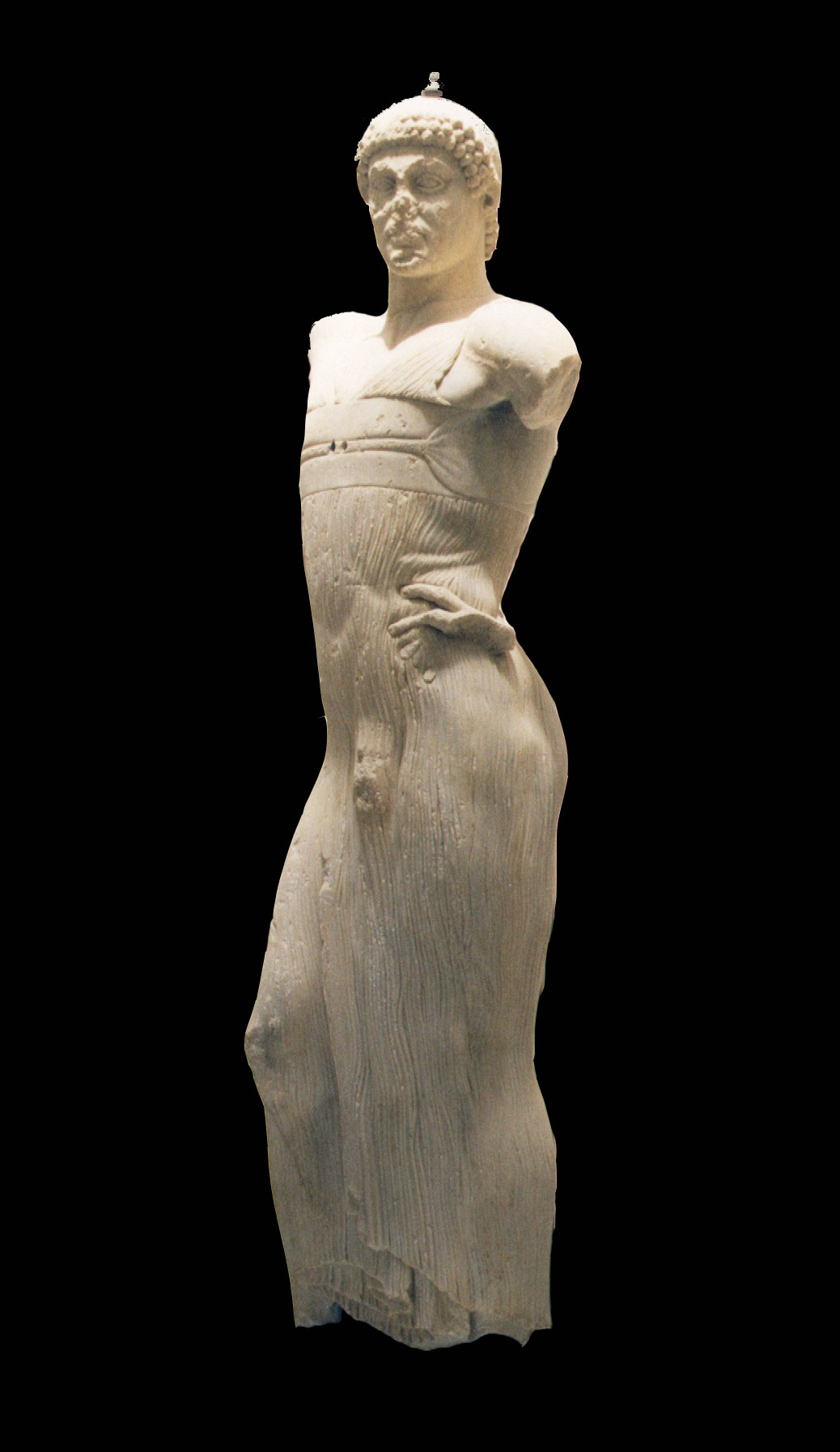
The Motya Charioteer (5th century BC)

Between the promontory of Lilybaeum (Capo Boéo) and that of Aegithallus (San Teodoro), the coast forms a deep bight, in front of which lies a long group of low rocky islets, called the Stagnone. Within these, and considerably nearer to the mainland, lies Motya island formerly called San Pantaleo, on which lie the remains of the ancient city. The island is nearly 850 m (2,790 ft) long and 750 m (2,460 ft) wide, and about 1 km (0.62 mi) (six stadia) from the mainland of Sicily. It was joined to the mainland in ancient times by a causeway, over which chariots with large wheels could reach the town.

The confined space on which the city was built agrees with the description of Diodorus that the houses were lofty and of solid construction, with narrow streets (στενωποί) between them, which facilitated the desperate defence of the inhabitants. Much of the walls, with those of two gateways, can be seen whose circuit is about 2.5 kilometres (1.6 mi).

The island of Motya is owned and operated by the Whitaker Foundation (Palermo), known for Marsala wines. The museum has artifacts that display Egyptian, Corinthian, Attic, Roman, Punic and Hellenic influences.

The Tophet, a type of cemetery for the cremated remains of children, possibly (but not entirely proven) as sacrifice to Tanit or Baʿal Hammon is exposed. Many of the ancient residences are open to the public.

== History ==
=== Phoenician Period ===
The foundation of the settlement dates from the first half of the eighth century BC. Like Carthage, it was originally a Phoenician colony, who were fond of choosing similar sites, and probably was originally merely a commercial station or emporium, but gradually rose to be a flourishing and important town. The Phoenicians transformed the inhospitable island into one of the most affluent cities of its time, naturally defended by the lagoon.

By 650 BC the settlement had grown into a busy port-city with maritime trade extending to the central and western Mediterranean. This prosperity caused rivalry with powerful Carthage nearby on the North African coast, despite their ancient common ancestry. Towards the middle of the sixth century BC, Carthaginian forces led by General Malchus destroyed Motya. The city soon recovered and the population quickly rebuilt the city on a monumental scale and built the first defensive walls, some of the earliest in the central Mediterranean.

Motya is first mentioned by Hecataeus of Miletus, and Thucydides notes it among the chief colonies of the Phoenicians in Sicily at the time of the Athenian expedition in 415 BC. A few years later (409 BC) when the Carthaginian army under general Hannibal Mago landed at the promontory of Lilybaeum, he laid up his fleet for security in the gulf around Motya, while he advanced with his land forces along the coast to attack Selinus. After the fall of the latter city, we are told that Hermocrates, the Syracusan exile, who had established himself on its ruins, laid waste the territories of Motya and Panormus. During the second expedition of the Carthaginians under Hamilcar (407 BC), these two harbours became the permanent stations of the Carthaginian fleet.

=== Carthaginian Period ===
In common with the other Phoenician settlements in Sicily, it passed under the government or dependency of Carthage, since Diodorus calls it a Carthaginian colony, but this may not be strictly correct.

As the Greek colonies in Sicily increased in numbers and importance, the Carthaginians gradually abandoned their settlements in the east and concentrated themselves in the three principal colonies of Soluntum, Panormus (modern Palermo), and Motya. Motya became one of the chief Carthaginian strongholds, as well as one of their most important commercial cities in Sicily due to its proximity to Carthage and its opportune situation for communication with North Africa, as well as the natural strength of its position.

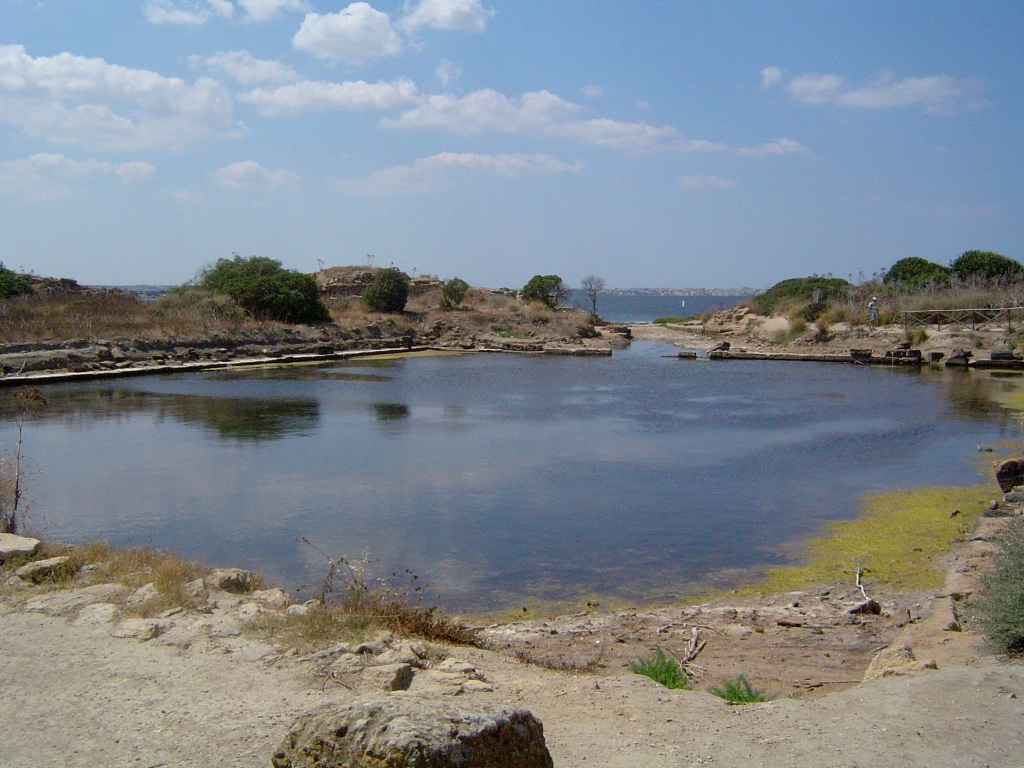
Kothon of Motya

==== Siege of Motya ====
The important status of Motya led Dionysius I of Syracuse in 398 BC to invade Carthaginian territory in Sicily. The Motyans, supported by Carthage, made preparations for vigorous resistance and, by cutting off the causeway which linked them to the mainland, compelled Dionysius to repair it or build a new causeway. When the military engines of Dionysius (among which the formidable catapult made its appearance for the first time) were brought up to the walls, the Motyans continued a desperate resistance and after the walls and towers were breached by the overwhelming forces of the enemy, they still defended from street to street and from house to house. Their struggle only increased the hatred of the Sicilian Greeks for the Carthaginians and when the troops of Dionysius were victorious, they put the whole population, men, women, and children, to the sword.

Dionysus garrisoned it under an officer named Biton, while his brother Leptines of Syracuse made it the base of his fleet. But the next spring (396 BC) Himilcon, the Carthaginian general, having landed at Panormus with a large force, recovered possession of Motya with comparatively little difficulty. Motya was not destined to recover its former importance for Himilcon was struck with the superior advantages of the promontory of Lilybaeum and founded a new city there to which he transferred the few remaining inhabitants of Motya.

=== Greek and Roman Periods ===
From this period Motya disappears from documented history. Although we have no account of Motya having received any Greek population or having fallen into the hands of the Greeks before its conquest by Dionysius, there exist coins of the city with the Greek legend "ΜΟΤΥΑΙΟΝ". They are, however, of great rarity and imitated those of the neighbouring city of Segesta.

Archaeology has shown (e.g. the House of the mosaics) that it continued to be inhabited, including by wealthy Greeks.

In 2006 archaeological digs uncovered a house built against the town's walls, the finds from which have shown that the town had a "thriving population long after it is commonly believed to have been destroyed by the Ancient Greeks." Discovered items include cooking pans, Phoenician-style vases, altars, and looms.

=== Middle Ages ===
During the Middle Ages, Basilian monks settled on the island and renamed it San Pantaleo, and in 1888 it was rediscovered by Joseph Whitaker.

== Archaeology ==
=== Motya Charioteer ===
The Motya Charioteer sculpture found in 1979 is on display at the Giuseppe Whitaker museum. It is a rare example of a victor of a chariot race who must have been very wealthy in order to commission such a work. It was found built into Phoenician fortifications which were quickly erected before Dionysios I of Syracuse invaded and sacked Motya in 397 BC.

Its superb quality implies that it was made by a leading Greek artist in the period following their defeat of the Persians, but its style is unlike any other of this period. It is believed it must have been looted from a Greek city conquered by Carthage in 409-405 BC.

=== The earliest settlement ===
Recent archaeology carried out by La Sapienza University in the area of the "Kothon" found the earliest occupation of the Phoenician settlement dating from the second quarter of the 8th century BC. It started at the anchorage identified on the southern shore of the island, and grew around the nearby springs, where the earliest sacred area was erected (Temple C5). This area initiated rapid growth of the town and houses spread over the acropolis (which had already hosted a huge prehistoric village). Three main centres soon became established:

- the southern housing quarter with public buildings (Building C8 and Temple C5)
- the acropolis
- the northern quarter with docks and industrial areas linked to the Sicilian coast opposite.

At least two thirds of the island were still left free for agriculture.

=== The Kothon ===
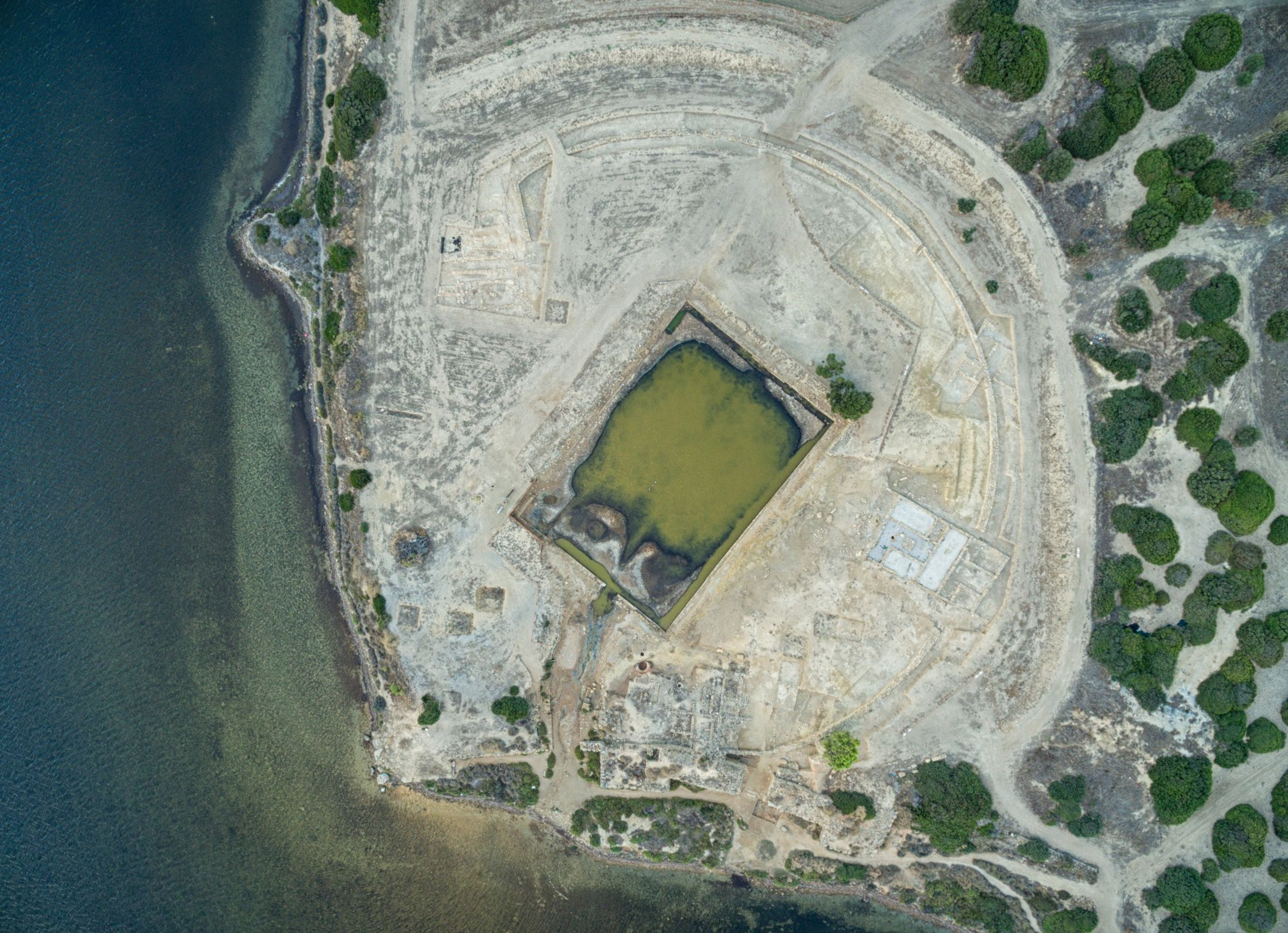
Kothon and Temenos aerial view

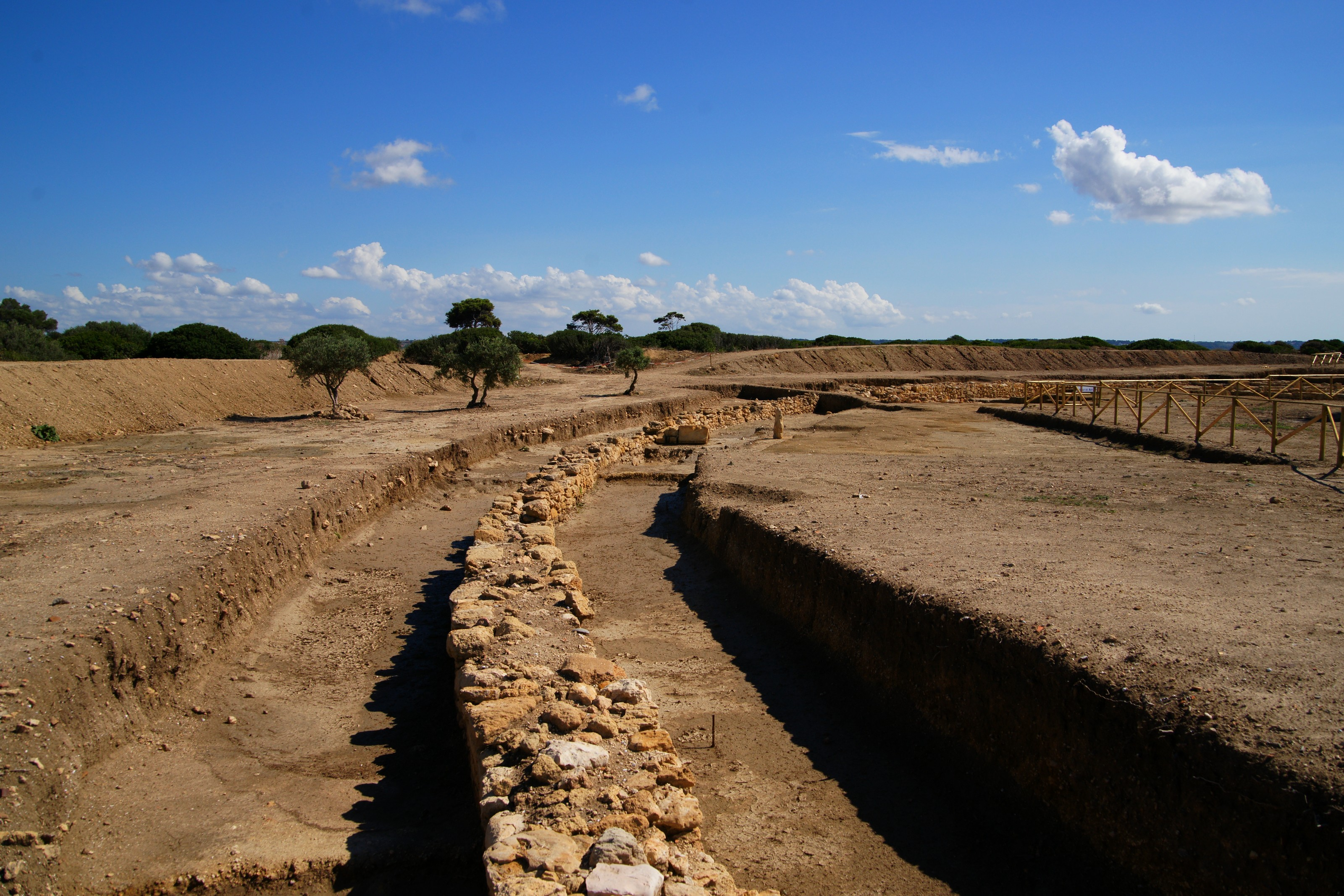
Temenos circular perimeter wall

A cothon, as it usually spelled in English, is a typical feature of Phoenician ports. The cothon at Motya is an artificial lake on an otherwise very dry island that had long puzzled archaeologists since the first excavations by Joseph Whitaker in 1906/07. The lake was fed by the only fresh water spring on the island and enclosed with a rectangular, 52.5 m × 35.7 m (172 ft 3 in × 117 ft 2 in), perimeter wall of carved limestone blocks with a drain towards the sea. The basin, which was slightly bigger than an Olympic-sized swimming pool, was carved into the rock with a maximum depth of 2.5 metres (8 ft).

Although thought at one time to be a harbour, in ancient times sea level was about 1 metre (3 ft) lower than today (which is also shown by the depth of the causeway to the island) and entry of large ships into the basin would have been impossible.

Instead it is the largest known sacred pool in the ancient Mediterranean world and the area all around the Kothon, the Temenos or temple area, was also sacred and was enclosed by a semicircular wall which has been exposed.

Next to the Kothon are three temples, the Temple of Baal, the Temple of Astarte and the "sanctuary of the Holy Waters". The temples of Baʿal and Astarte date to the first Phoenician settlement 800–750 BC. At this time, the site of the later Kothon was a natural spring-fed pool with a block-lined side.

The Kothon was rebuilt as a monumental pool with the rest of the city between 550 and 520 BC after the destruction of the city by the Carthaginians. The Kothon had a platform in the centre as a base for a statue of the Phoenician god Baʿal.

Only after the destruction of the city in 397/6 BC was a section of the nearby city wall dismantled and a small channel opened in the Kothon wall towards the sea. In the later Roman period (2nd to 4th c. AD) it was used for fish farming and the production of salt.

=== City walls ===
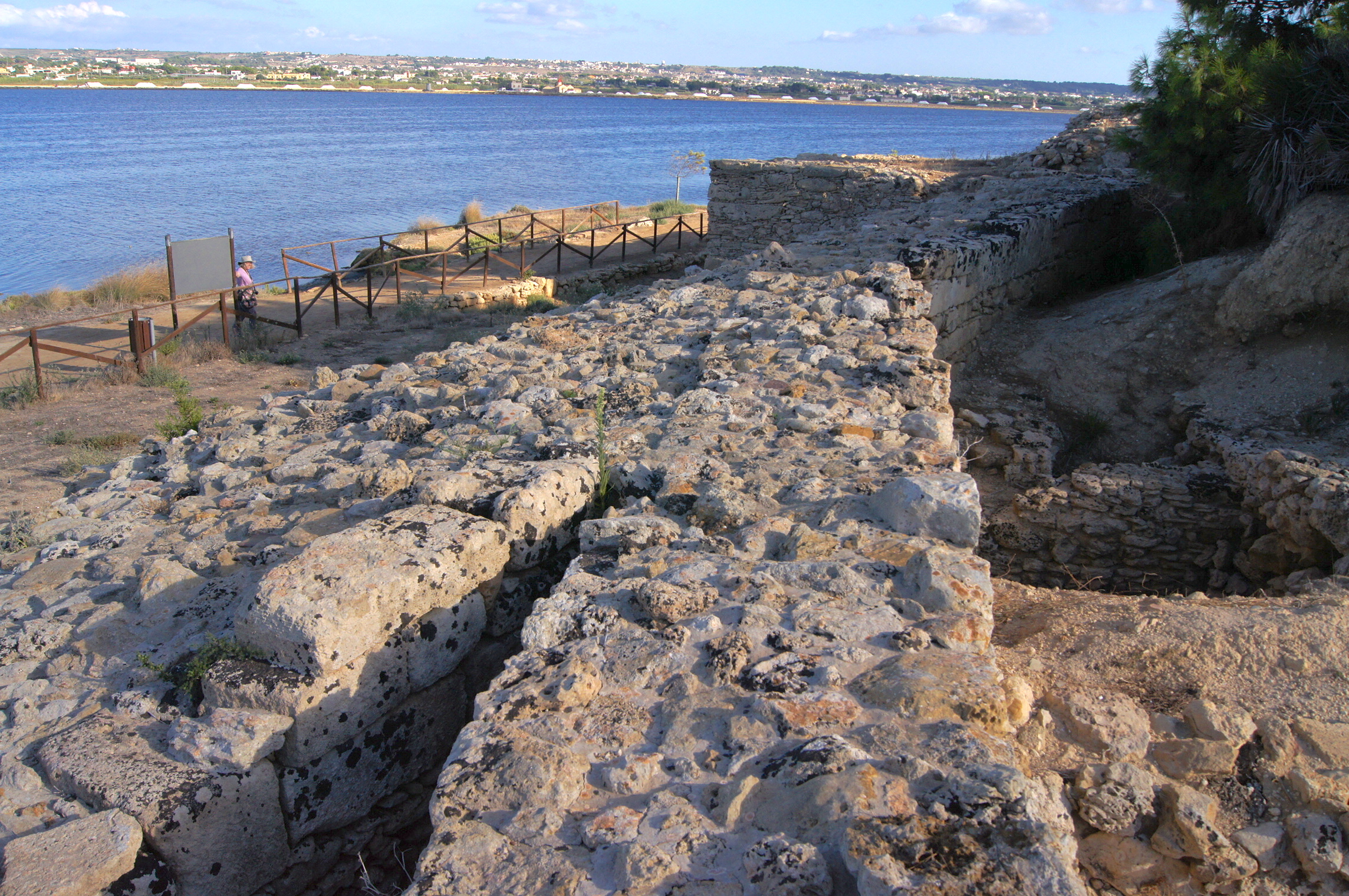
Walls of Motya 1

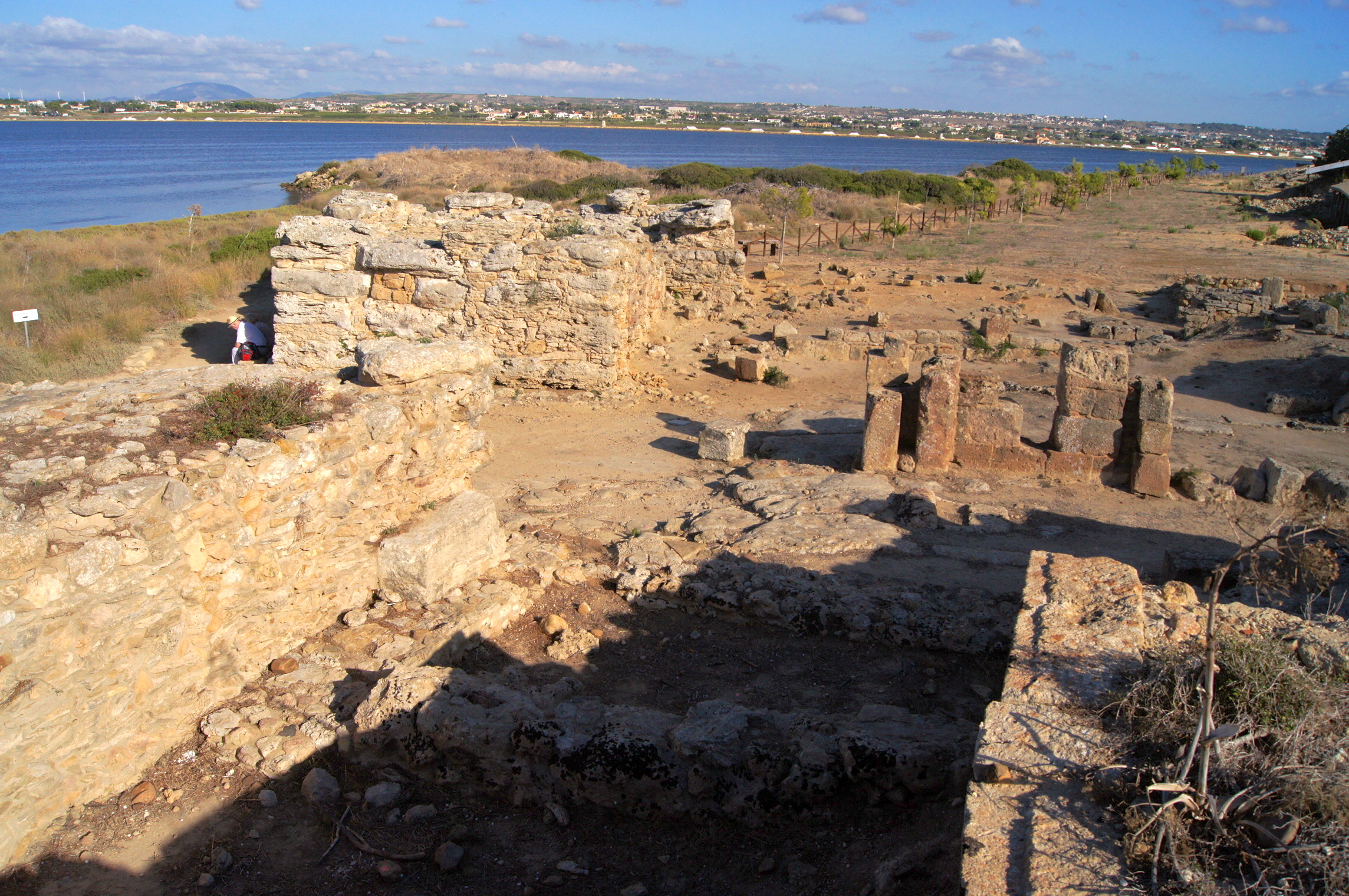
North gate

The city walls originally enclosed the entire island and are best preserved along the east coast.

In 1874 the area of the North Gate was discovered where a large sculpture ornamented the double-arch passage. The city walls were revealed further by G. Whitaker at the beginnìng of the last century. Their systematic exploration started in the 1960s by the Brltish Expeditlon who focused on the North and South Gates. From 1974 to 1992 La Sapienza University of Rome carried out yearly campaigns on walls, especially along the eastern and northern shores. Four major construction phases were identified. They resumed excavation in 2002 with the identification of the West Gate and the excavation of the western fortress. Since 2015 archaeology was resumed on the walls between the East Tower and the North Gate.

The 4 phases are:

- Phase 1 (550–520 BC): the main wall had a width of about 1 metre (3 ft), with rectangular towers at regular intervals (21–23 metres, 69–75 ft) along the perimeter and can be admired on the northern and eastern sides of the island. The foundation was of irregular ashlars of medium size, forming a double curtain on outer and inner faces with mud mortar, and an inner fill. The upper layers used greyish mudbricks.
- Phase 2 (520–480 BC): the main wall was built on a new foundation 1.5 metres (5 ft) high of big limestone blocks. The upper layers used reddish-brown mudbricks plastered with lime. The North Gate is protected by adding two projecting towers.
- Phase 3 (480–450 BC): the wall is further reinforced by adding protruding rectangular towers along the perimeter with side staircases of carefully-cut local sandstone slabs, possibly due to a change in tactics.
- Phase 4 (450–397 BC): the wall reaches the maximum width of 5.2 metres (17 ft) with the addition of a base made of big limestone splinters and an ashlar masonry revetment in some places. The wall base is preserved at some places at a height of more than 5m including part of the mudbrick superstructure. All around the wall at the changes of orientation, huge square protruding towers (12 by 12 metres, 39 ft × 39 ft) (Eastern Tower, South Tower, Western Fortress) were built overlooking the walls in addition to the existing bastions.

=== House of mosaics ===
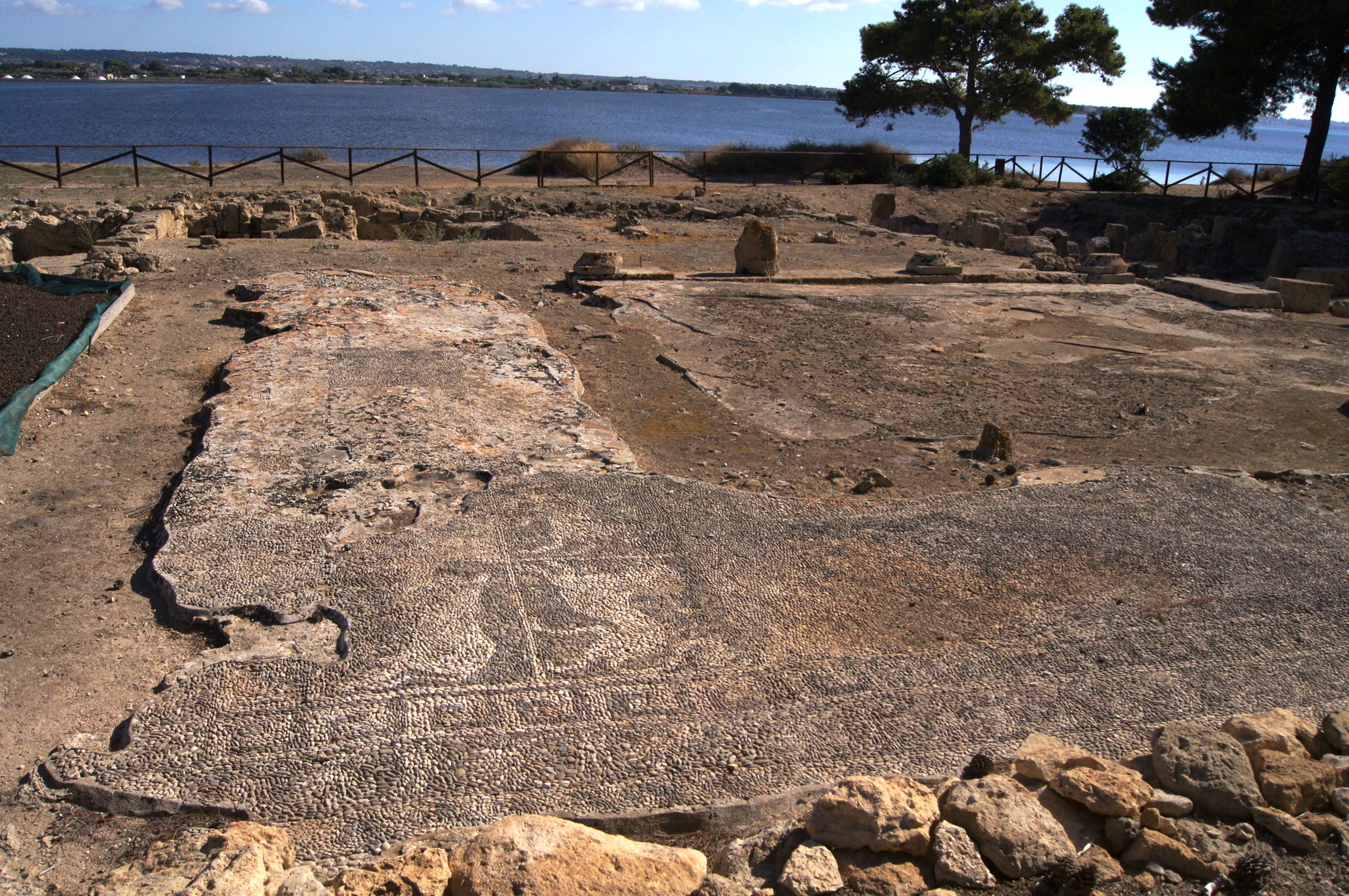
House of the mosaics

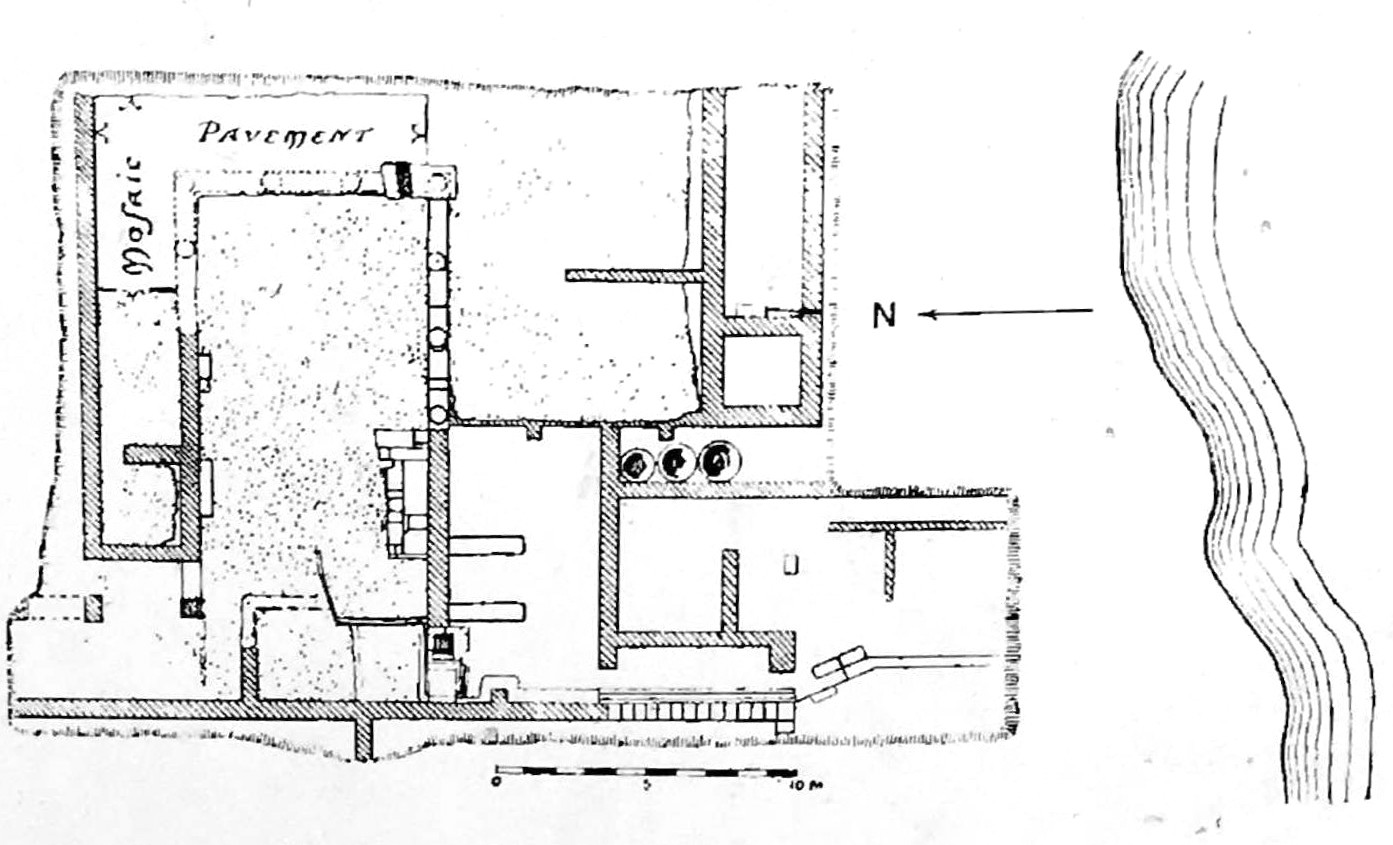
House of Mosaics Plan

This house is built on two levels against the city walls on the seashore, suggesting the walls were no longer in use and in ruins. On the upper level is a courtyard with a peristyle paved with a pebble mosaic which is the only example of its type in Sicily. It resembles a panelled carpet with a complex geometric border and with the panels containing depictions of hunting wild animals (a lion attacking a bull, a bird of prey, a deer). Its format dates it from similar ones in mainland Greece and its colonies to the 3rd century BC. The peristyle has residential rooms around it.

On the lower level in the southwestern part of the house are 6 service rooms with three large pithoi (food storage vessels).

== In fiction ==
The 399 BC Battle of Motya, part of the war of Syracuse's tyrant Dionysios I against Carthage is a major event in the 1965 historical novel The Arrows of Hercules by L. Sprague de Camp.
