= Mamercus =

Mamercus is an ancient Roman name. In late antiquity it is found also as Mamertus.

== People with the name ==
People named Mamercus or Mamertus include:

- Mamercus, legendary ancestor of the Roman gens with the nomen Aemilius; see Aemilia gens
- Mamercus Aemilius Mamercinus (fl. 5th century BC)
- Mamercus of Catane, tyrant of the Sicilian city Catane 345-338 BC
- Mamercus Aemilius Lepidus Livianus (d. c. 62 BC)
- Mamercus Aemilius Scaurus (fl. early 1st century)
- Claudianus Mamertus (d. c. 473), Gallo-Roman theologian and brother of Saint Mamertus
- Saint Mamertus (d. c. 475)

== See also ==
- Mamuralia
