= Giuseppe Giarrizzo =

Italian historian and academic (1927 - 2015)

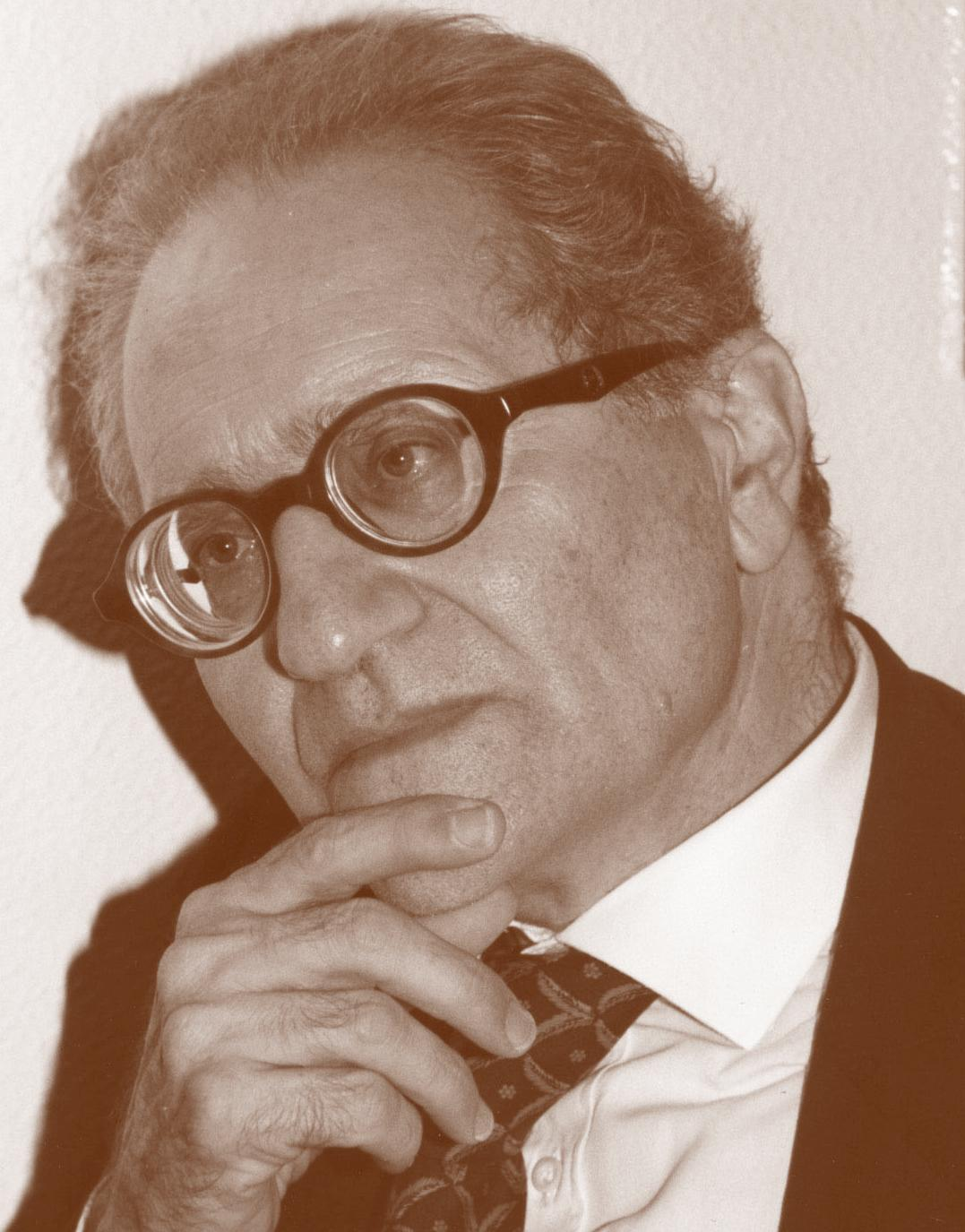
- Born: 8 November 1927; Riposto, Italy
- Died: 28 November 2015 (aged 88); Catania, Italy
- Occupation: historian

Giuseppe Giarrizzo (8 November 1927 - 28 November 2015) was an Italian historian and academic. He was professor emeritus at the University of Catania.

== Life and career ==
Born in Riposto, the son of a sea captain, Giarrizzo studied letters under Santo Mazzarino at the University of Catania, graduating in 1949. In 1950 he won a fellowship at the Benedetto Croce's Italian Institute for Historical Studies, where under the guidance of Federico Chabod he authored his first essay, Edward Gibbon: His View of Life and Conception of History. Between 1951 and 1954, he collaborated with Enciclopedia Italiana, writing entries related to the history of Christianity and English history. He then left this commitment as a Rockefeller Foundation fellowship led him to do academic trips in England, France and Holland.

After having served as a lecturer for several years, in 1964 he became an ordinary professor of modern history at his alma mater, and between 1968 and 1999 he also served as dean of the faculty. A member of the Accademia dei Lincei from 1994, he was founder and editor of the journal L’altra Sicilia and editor of the magazine Rivista storica italiana, as well as collaborator of several publications. Among other things, he was author of books about David Hume, Giambattista Vico and the history of Sicily. A longtime associate of the Italian Socialist Party, between 1985 and 1986 he was town planning councillor of Catania.
