= Soluntum =

Ancient city on the northern coast of Sicily, Italy

- Solunto
- Solus
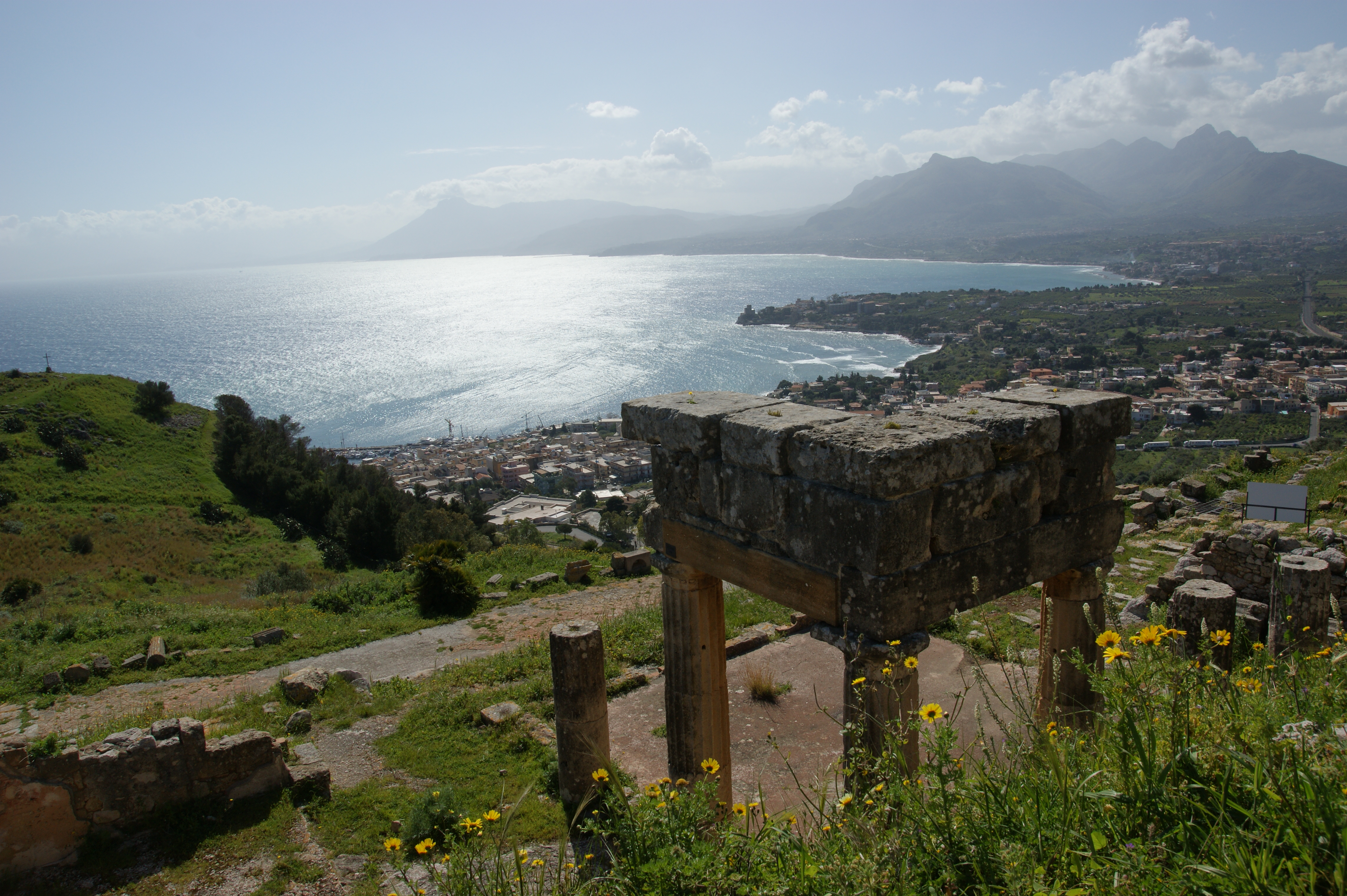
- View from Soluntum

- Location within Italy
- 38°04′27″N 13°32′29″E
- Type: Settlement
- Location: Santa Flavia, Province of Palermo, Sicily, Italy

Site notes
- Area: 10 ha (25 acres)
- Management: Soprintendenza BB.CC.AA. di Palermo
- Public access: Yes
- Website: Archaeological Park of Himera, Solunto and Iato

Soluntum or Solus was an ancient city on the Tyrrhenian coast of Sicily, near present-day Porticello in the comune of Santa Flavia, Italy. The site is a major tourist attraction. The city was founded by the Phoenicians in the sixth century BC and was one of the three chief Phoenician settlements in Sicily in the archaic and classical periods. It was destroyed at the beginning of the fourth century BC and re-founded on its present site atop Monte Catalfano. At the end of the fourth century BC, Greek soldiers were settled there and in the 3rd century BC the city came under the control of the Roman Republic. Excavations took place in the 19th century and in the mid-20th century. Around half of the urban area has been uncovered and it is relatively well preserved. The remains provide a good example of an ancient city in which Greek, Roman and Punic traditions mixed.

== Names ==
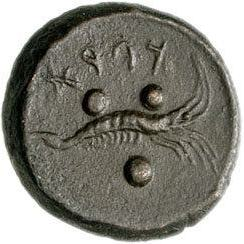
Phoenician coin minted in Solountum, with the legend kpraʾ in Punic script.

The Punic name of the town was simply Kapara (𐤊𐤐𐤓𐤀, kprʾ), meaning "Village".

The Greek name appears in surviving coins as Solontînos (Σολοντῖνος) but appears variously in other sources as Solóeis (Σολόεις), Soloûs (Σολοῦς), and Solountînos. Some scholars contend that Soluntum and Solus were two different cities at close quarters, Soluntum, higher upon the hillside, being a later habitation displacing the earlier settlement of Solus, at a lower elevation. These were Latinized as Soluntum and Solus, which became the modern Italian name Solunto.

== Geography ==
Soluntum lay 183 m (600 ft) above sea level on the southeast side of Monte Catalfano (373 m or 1,225 ft), commanding a fine view from a naturally-strong situation. It is immediately to the east of the bold promontory called Capo Zafferano. It was about 16 km (9.9 mi) east of ancient Panormus (modern Palermo). The city covers an area of about 10 ha (25 acres), around half of which has been excavated.

== History ==
The Phoenicians founded the city in the 8th or 7th century BC, according to Thucydides. They had established several other trading emporia in the west of Sicily, including Motya and Panormus (modern Palermo). In 539 BC, the Phoenicians in the eastern Mediterranean were conquered by the Persian empire. The Phoenicians of the western Mediterranean (known to the Romans as Punics) became independent and Carthage in particular developed into a major city, which brought the Phoenician settlements in Sicily under its control at an uncertain point in time. Increasingly the Phoenicians and Greeks in Sicily came into conflict with one another.

Settlements in Sicily. Phoenician settlements (purple), Greek settlements (red), indigenous settlements (white).

The location of the archaic city has long been uncertain. No archaic remains have been found in the excavations at Soluntum, so it is clear that it was not located on the same site as the later city. Recent excavations revealed a Punic necropolis at Capo Solanto to the south of the city, with remains from the sixth and fifth centuries BC, and this is now believed to have been the location of the archaic city.

In 409 BC, the Carthaginians invaded Sicily and conquered many Greek cities, including Selinus, Agrigentum, and Gela. After a short piece, the Carthaginians besieged Syracuse in 398 BC, whose tyrant Dionysius I managed to fend them off, recapture most of the lost territory. Soluntum remained loyal to Carthage even in 397 BC, when Dionysius invaded the Punic part of the island and destroyed Motya, causing most of Carthage's allies to defect. Dionysius ravaged its territory without success, but in 396 BC it was betrayed to Dionysius and destroyed. The city was rebuilt in the middle of the fourth century, in its present location, atop Monte Catalfano. In 307 BC the Carthaginians gave the city to the soldiers and mercenaries of Agathocles, who had made peace with the Carthaginians after their leader abandoned them in Africa.

=== Roman period ===
For the first half of the First Punic War (264–241 BC) it was still subject to Carthage, but it surrendered to the Romans after the conquest of Panormus in 250 BC. Archaeology shows that the city flourished under Roman rule, especially in the second and first centuries BC, when extensive construction provided it with all the typical buildings of a Hellenistic city. The theatre and a new stoa were built in the 2nd century BC. The great statue of Zeus/Baal was dedicated in a local temple at around the same time. In the 1st century BC, baths were constructed. High-quality wall paintings from this century survive in one of the private houses.

The location of the city atop Monte Catalfano made it easy to defend, but difficult to supply with goods and food. In the times of peace after the Roman conquest, it was much more convenient to live down on the coast. Many Sicilian settlements, which had been founded on mountains, were thus abandoned in the Roman period. In the first century BC, Soluntum was one of the main exceptions to this pattern, inhabited by rich citizens, as the sumptuous decoration of the various houses shows. Cicero says that the city was a civitas, when Gaius Verres was governor of Sicily (73-71 BC).

A decline is observed in the first century AD. There was no notable construction in this period, except that the baths were renovated and new ones may have been built by the Agora. It is mentioned in passing in the first century AD by Pliny, in the second century AD by Ptolemy, and at the beginning of the 3rd century in the Itinerarium Antonini, which place it 12 miles from Panormus and 12 from Thermae (modern Termini Imerese). A Latin dedicatory inscription survives from the city, erected by the citizens in honour of Fulvia Plautilla, the wife of emperor Caracalla. The city was subsequently abandoned. Armin Wiegand suggests that this was due to an earthquake or landslide.

There are some Greek inscriptions from the city naming prominent citizens. One of them records that Antallus son of Asclapus from the family of the Ornichi paid for the main street to be paved from his own funds. Another one names Sextus Peduceus, who was governor of Sicily from 76 to 75 BC:

Τὸ κοιν[ὸν- - ? - -]
Σέξστον Πεδο̣[υκαῖον]
ἀντιστρά̣[τηγον]
τὸν αὐτῶν [πάτρωνα]
εὐνοίας ἕ[νεκα]

— ISic003419
Translation:

The League ... (honours)
Sextus Peduceus
the propraetor,
their patron,
for his good will.

A Latin inscription, erected by the citizens in honour of Fulvia Plautilla, the wife of Caracalla, was found in 1857.

=== Coinage ===
The city minted its own coinage, including numerous silver coins. The coins of the fifth century BC bear the Punic legend kpr or the Greek name ΣΟΛΟΝΤΙΝΟΝ. The silver coins were mostly didrachms and obols. The bronze coins consisted of the hemilitra (a Sicilian unit of coinage and weight) and the tetrras (quarter). A second phase of minting dates between the fourth and the mid-third centuries BC. It again consisted of silver coinage. The main motifs were Heracles and maritime symbols like the hippocamp. The final phase of coin production runs into the Roman period. The main motifs at this point were Poseidon, Athena, and perhaps Ares. Coins from Soluntum are found in many settlements throughout Sicily, indicating the economic power of the community.

== Excavations and remains ==
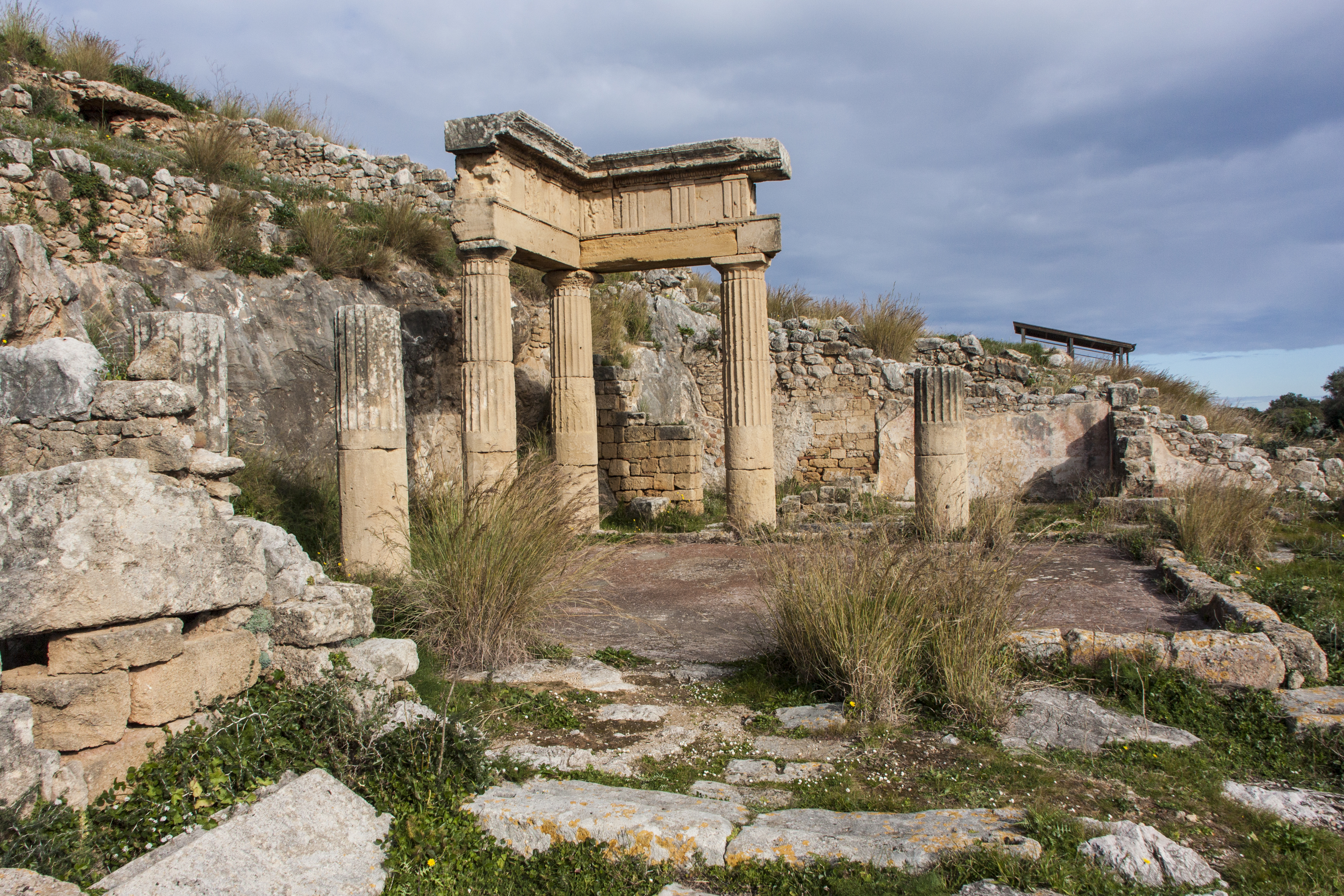
Gymnasium

Excavations have brought to light considerable remains of the ancient Roman town, and a good deal still remains unexplored. The site was identified using ancient literary sources by Tommaso Fazello in his 1558 history of Sicily. The first excavations were carried out in 1825 by Domenico Lo Faso Pietrasanta and published in his Le antichità della Sicilia. Vol 5: Antichità di Catana — Palermo. 1842, pp. 57–67. He unearthed a sanctuary and discovered several statues. Francesco Saverio Cavallari carried out systematic excavations from 1856, following his appointment as the first professor of archaeology at the University of Palermo. The first plan of the city was published in 1875.

Cavalleri's excavations were continued by Antonino Salinas, who published the first detailed reports. Minor excavations by Ettore Gabrici in 1920 only revealed a few rooms inside the city. Vincenzo Tusa began excavations in 1951. He found the "House of Leda" in 1953, the theatre in 1963, and the "House of Harpocrates" around 1970. One reason for the intensification of excavations was the potential seen for the ruins to become a tourist attraction. No final publication of Tusa's excavations has ever been published. Some of the artefacts recovered (especially the coins) are now kept in the Antonino Salinas Regional Archaeological Museum in Palermo; the rest is on display in the museum at the site.

Starting in 1964, the city was excavated by the German Archaeological Institute of Rome. Under Helmut Schläger, the architecture of the agora was investigated, but Schlager's early death prevented publication of the results. From 1988, Armin Wiegand investigated the theatre, eventually publishing a study of the building Markus Wolf has worked on the agora and the houses of the city, with a special focus on the gymnasium. In 2014, Alberto Sposito published an architectural study, presenting all excavated buildings and the current state oft heir remains.

=== Overview ===
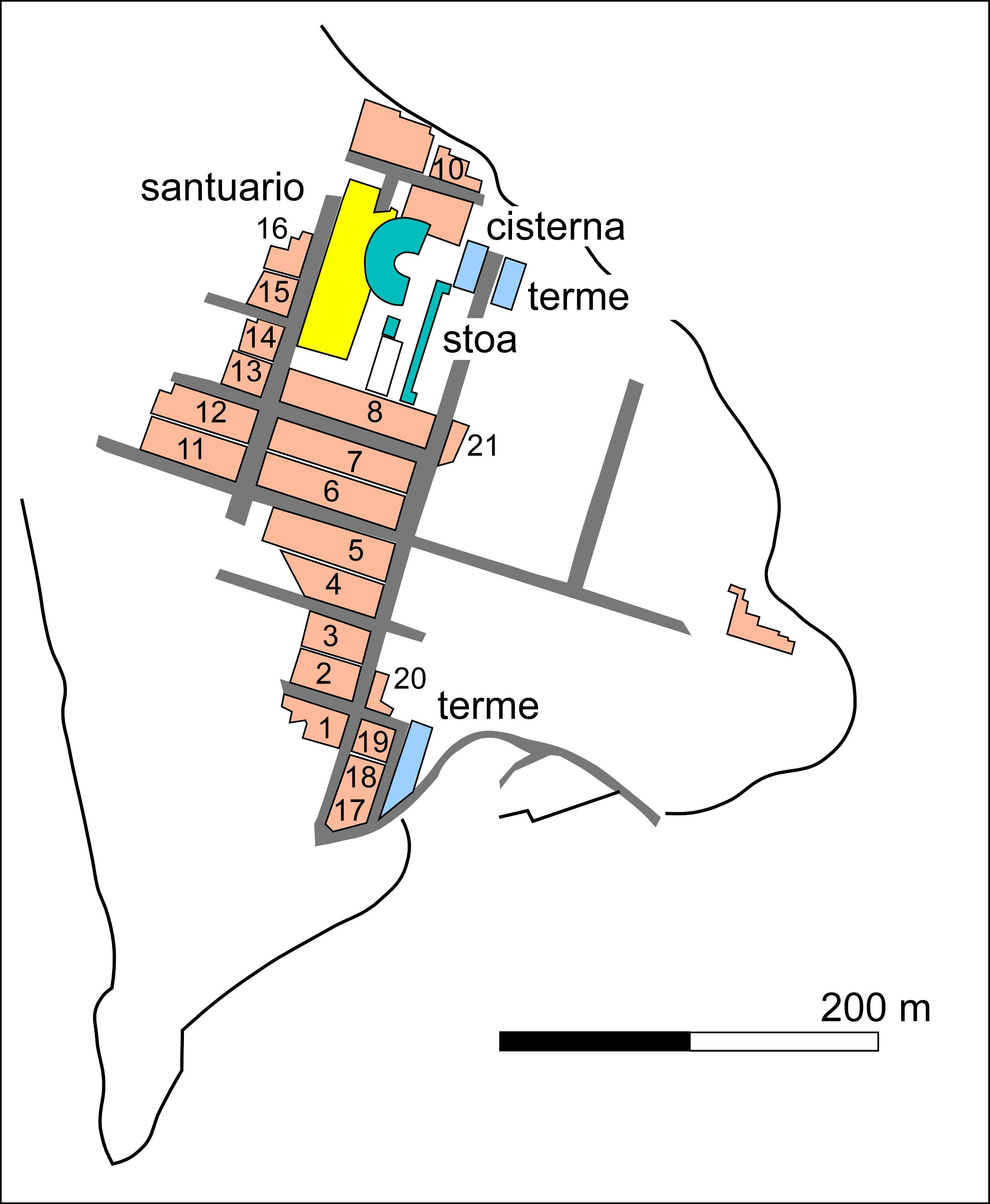
Map of Soluntum. The Via degli Artigiani runs past insulae 11–16, the Via dell’Agora from insula 17 to the "cisterna," and Via degli Ulivi runs parallel to them, to the east. The sanctuary is the yellow area; the theatre is the green semi-circle; the Agora is the area on the Via degli Artigiani in front of the "Stoa"; and the two bath-houses are the blue structures labelled "terme".

The city is located on the east slope of Monte Catalfano. The highest point of the city is some 60 metres above the lowest point. Despite the uneven terrain, the city's streets were laid out in a regular grid pattern, in accordance with the Hippodamian system. The individual insulae (blocks of housing) are now identified using Roman numerals. Only the entrance to the city in the southeast is adjusted to the steeply sloping terrain. The road winds its way up the mountainside until it becomes the "Via dell’Agora" ("Street of the Agora"), the main street of the city, which runs through the middle of town to the agora in the north. It is roughly level with the natural ground level, while the east-west side streets that cross it are essentially staircases running up and down the slope. Two more level streets run in parallel with the Via dell'Agora, one above it to the west and the other below it to the east, which are now known as the Via degli Artigiani (Street of the Artisans) and the Via degli Ulivi (Street of the Olives) respectively. These three main streets are about 6 metres wide, while the side streets are only 3 metres across. The blocks of houses formed by the grid measure about 40 × 80 metres. Each block is split in half by an east-west alleyway, which is about a metre wide. Most of the streets are paved with stone slabs. Especially, on the Via dell'Agora, the street frontage of most houses was occupied by workshops and shops.

It is uncertain when this Hippodamian grid pattern was imposed upon the city. Below the theatre are remains of an earlier house which is not aligned with this grid. This seems to indicate that it belongs to an earlier stage in the city's history before the grid pattern. Armin Wiegend suggested that the grid pattern was imposed when the Greek soldiers of Agathocles settled there in 307 BCE.

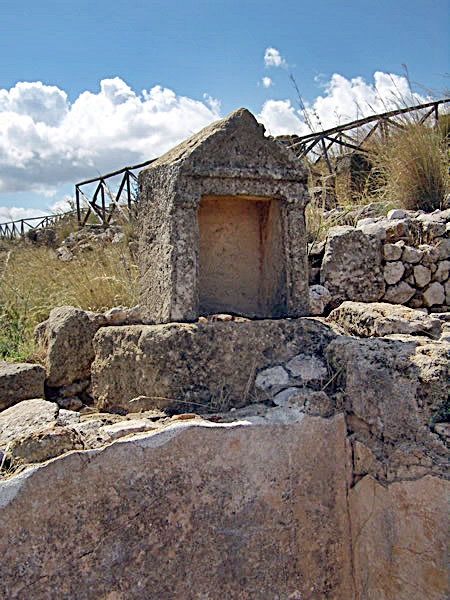
Punic household altar

Although the overall character of the city is Greco-Roman, there are also elements that researchers have attributed to Punic cultural background, especially in the religious sphere. The city had no temple in the Greco-Roman style, but there are three Punic sanctuaries. One of them contained an over-life-size statue of Zeus, which dates to the Hellenistic period. Another sanctuary contained a statue dating to around 300 BC, which belongs stylistically to the Punic artistic tradition. The preference for inhumation burials also accords with Punic tradition. Some of the houses have little chapels, containing typical Punic stelae. Another Punic element is the construction of walls using the opus africanum technique. In this system, the walls consist of a series of pillars, acting as supports, with the area between them filled in with loose stones. The rounded ends of the cisterns are also typically Punic. The floors of many of the houses employ the opus signinum technique, which developed in Carthage in the third century BC and only spread through the Roman empire later.

=== Public buildings ===
==== City walls ====
Thanks to the favourable location of the city atop a steep slope, the city did not need a full circuit wall. In the south and west, there are sheer cliffs. In the north, the slope has been worn away with the passage of time and part of the city has gone with it. It thus remains unclear, whether there was ever a wall along this side. A wall with towers is attested with certainty only in the east and northwest sides of the city.

To the southeast of the city, where the road winds up the slope from the shore, there are remains of fortifications along the road. It could be that these are the remains of a tower, but the area has never been excavated. Further remains are found to the northwest of the city, on the edge of the cliff, where part of the city has eroded away. There are remains of a wall and a rectangular tower there, as well as a large cistern which might also have been part of a fort. Next to it is an old road, leading up to the very top of the mountain. Excavations in 1875 in the easternmost part of the city, where there is a good view out of the sea, revealed an altar and other structures. Perhaps the city's harbours were watched from here.

==== Bathhouse ====
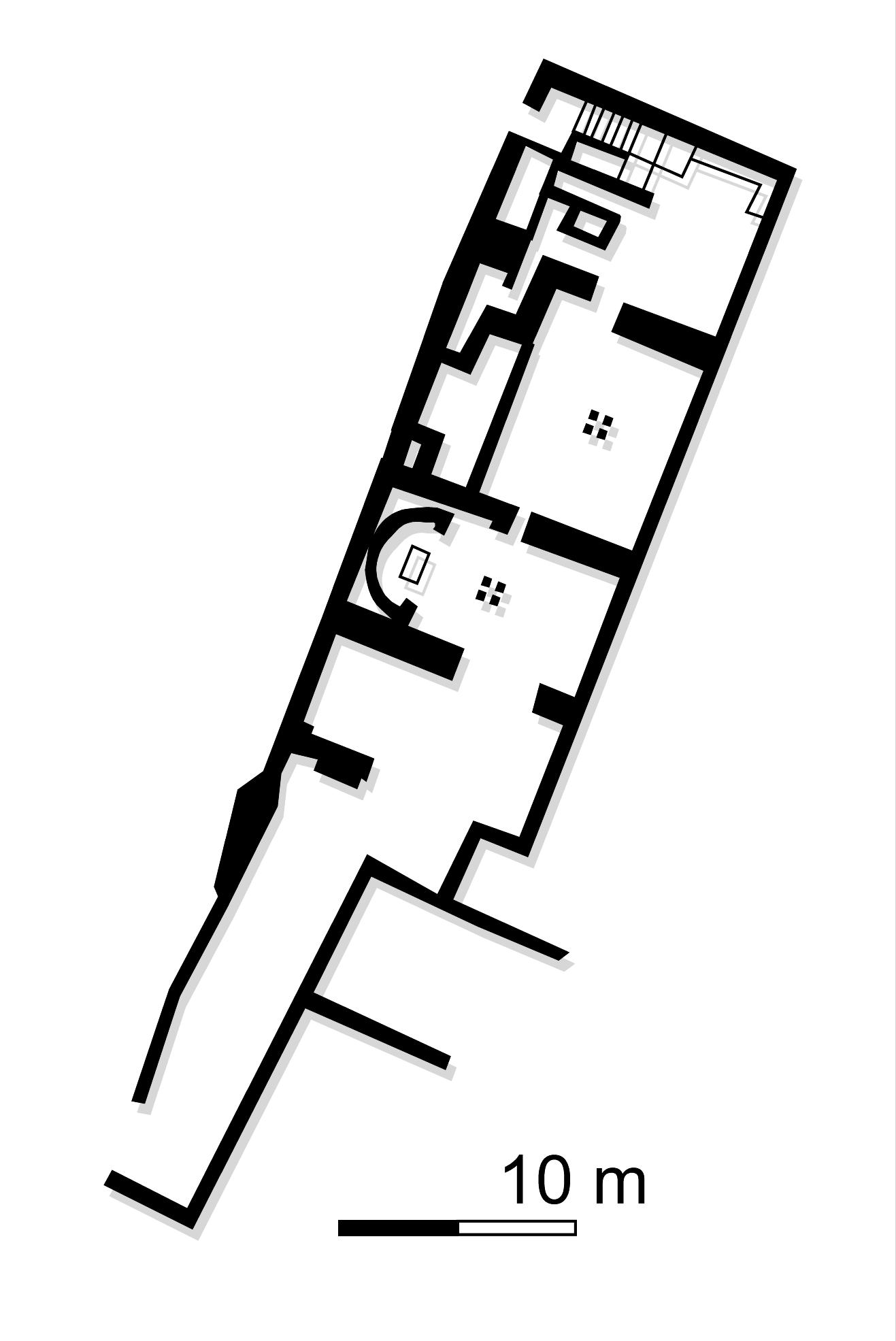
Plan of the bathhouse (partially reconstructed)

The remains of the bathhouse are located at the south end of the city. The small building consisted of four large rooms and some smaller side rooms. At the south end, there was an open courtyard, next to the frigidarium which was originally decorated with a geometric mosaic – now completely destroyed. North of this was the tepidarium, with an apse on the western side, then the caldarium and the laconicum. The tepidarium and caldarium sat on top of a hypocaust system.

One of the side rooms contains a set of stairs and a small hallway behind the caldarium contains a colourful mosaic depicting a vase. Remains of doric columns attest to the elaborate architectural ornamentation of the building. Parts of the eastern side of the bathhouse are lost, due to parts of the steep cliff face slipping away. The bathhouse was probably built in the first century BC. The geometric mosaic dates to the first century AD, when the building was renovated.

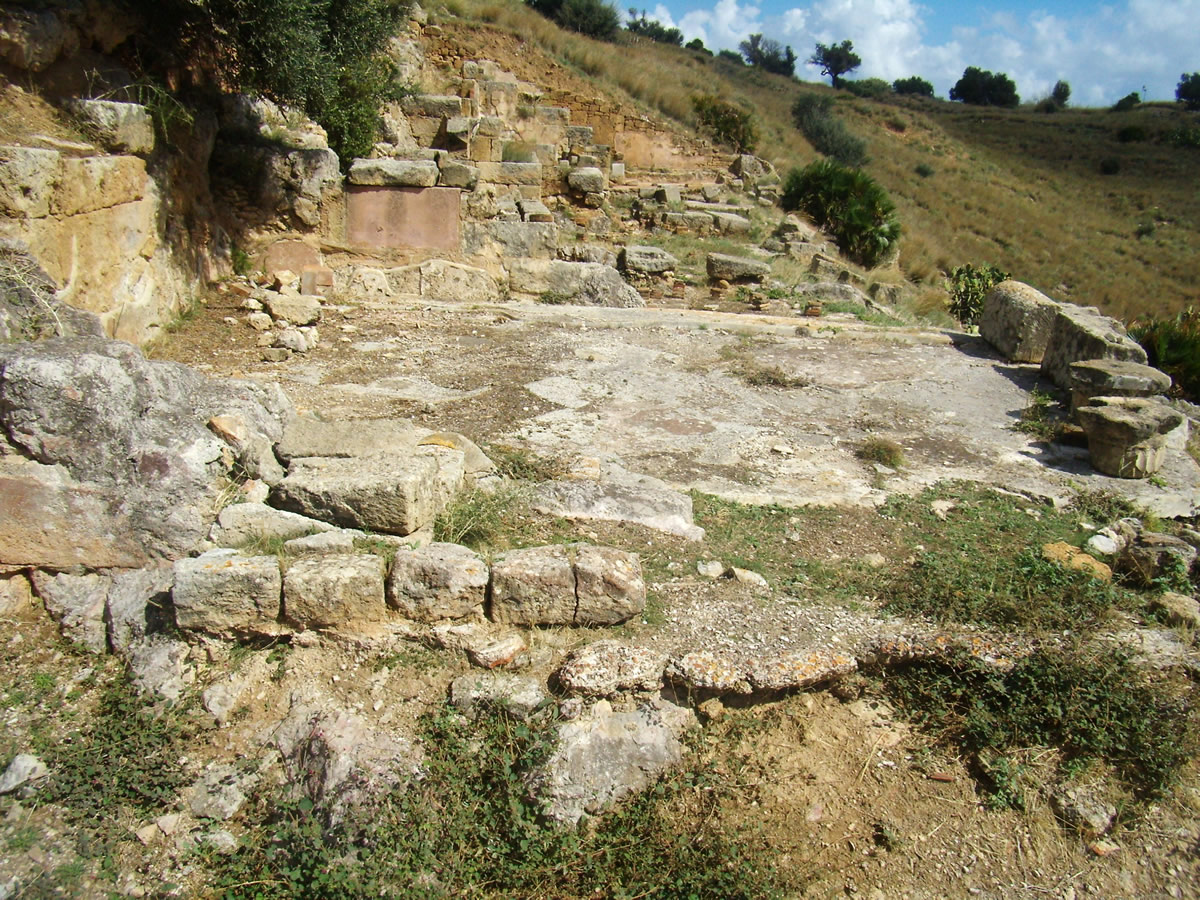
Frigidarium, seen from the south

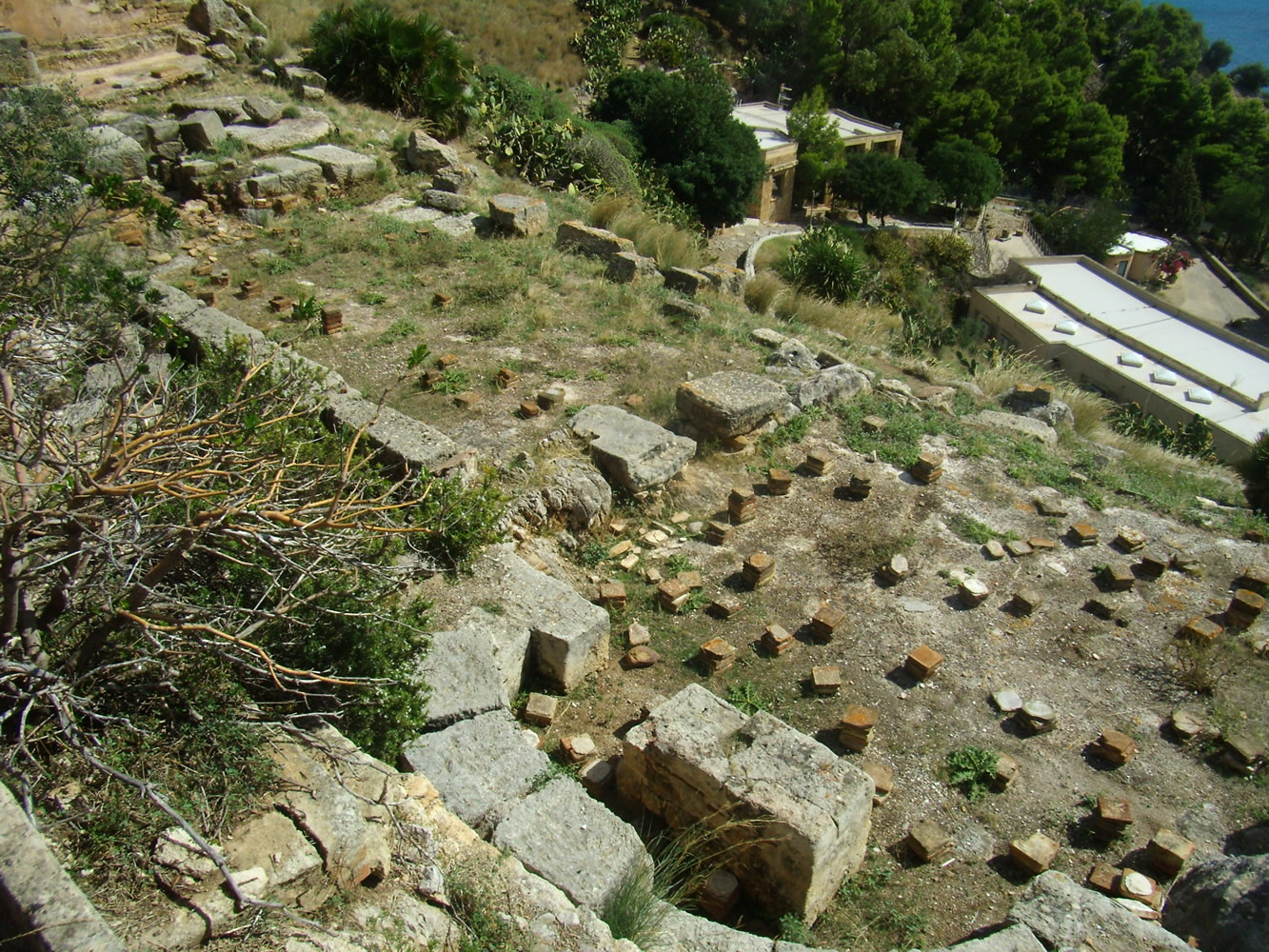
Caldarium and tepidarium, seen from the west

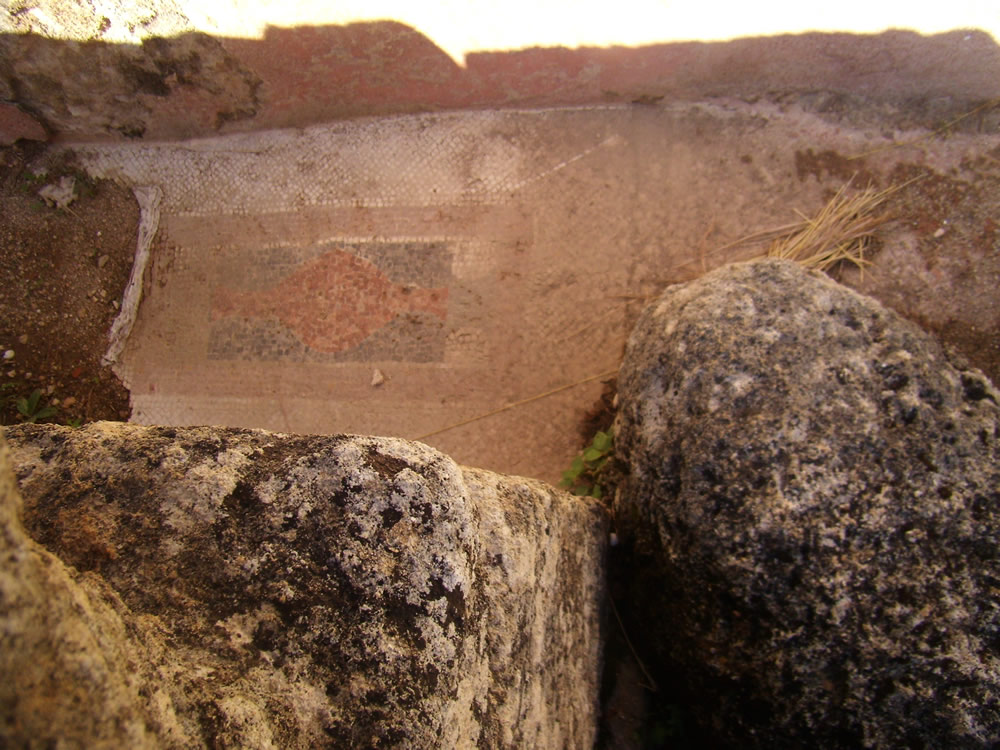
Mosaic depicting a vase

==== Agora ====
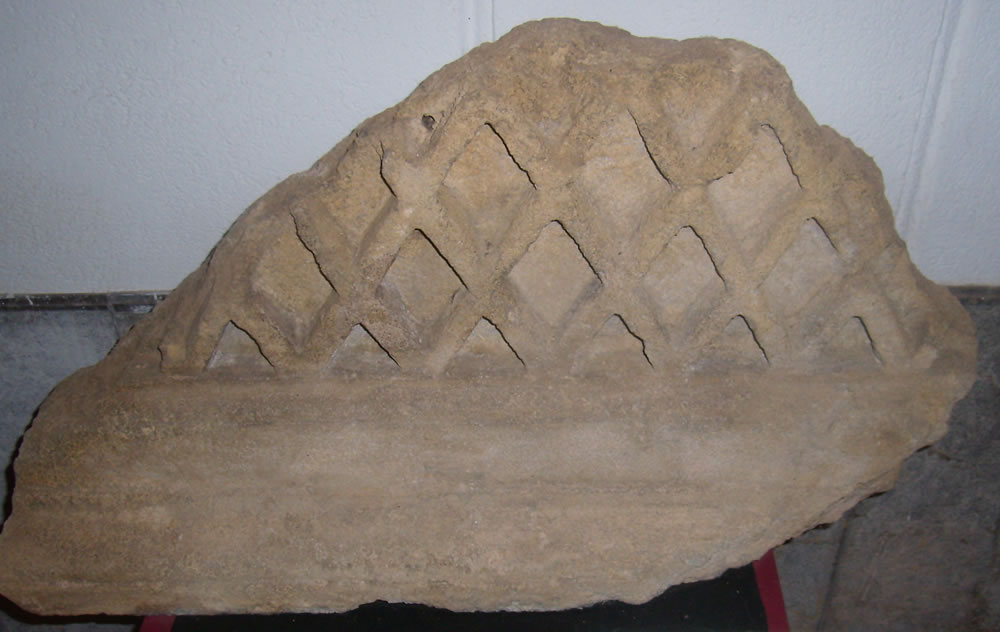
Decorative block from the second story of the stoa

The agora is a rectangular plaza, which was the central place for festivals, gatherings, and markets in the city. There appears to have been a doorway or gate at the southern entrance since remains of a stone threshold and a large six-pointed star made of plaster were found there. The west side was bordered by a stoa of the type with projecting wings. It is 68.7 metres long and 20.3 metres wide. There are two side wings. The whole front of the stoa is lined with columns. Behind this are nine exedrae. The Doric columns of the portico are mostly lost, but much of the structure remains, including parts of the tufa sima, which are decorated with lion's head waterspouts and can be dated stylistically to the second century BC. The second story of the stoa was made up of half-columns, with decorative blocks bearing a diamond pattern in between them. These blocks were also used for the second floor of the stage building in the theatre and the second floor of the peristyles of several of the private houses. It is a decorative element that was particularly popular in the western Mediterranean. In the northernmost exedra there are two spaces for statues with Greek inscriptions identifying them as statues of Apollonius and Ariston (a father-son pair).

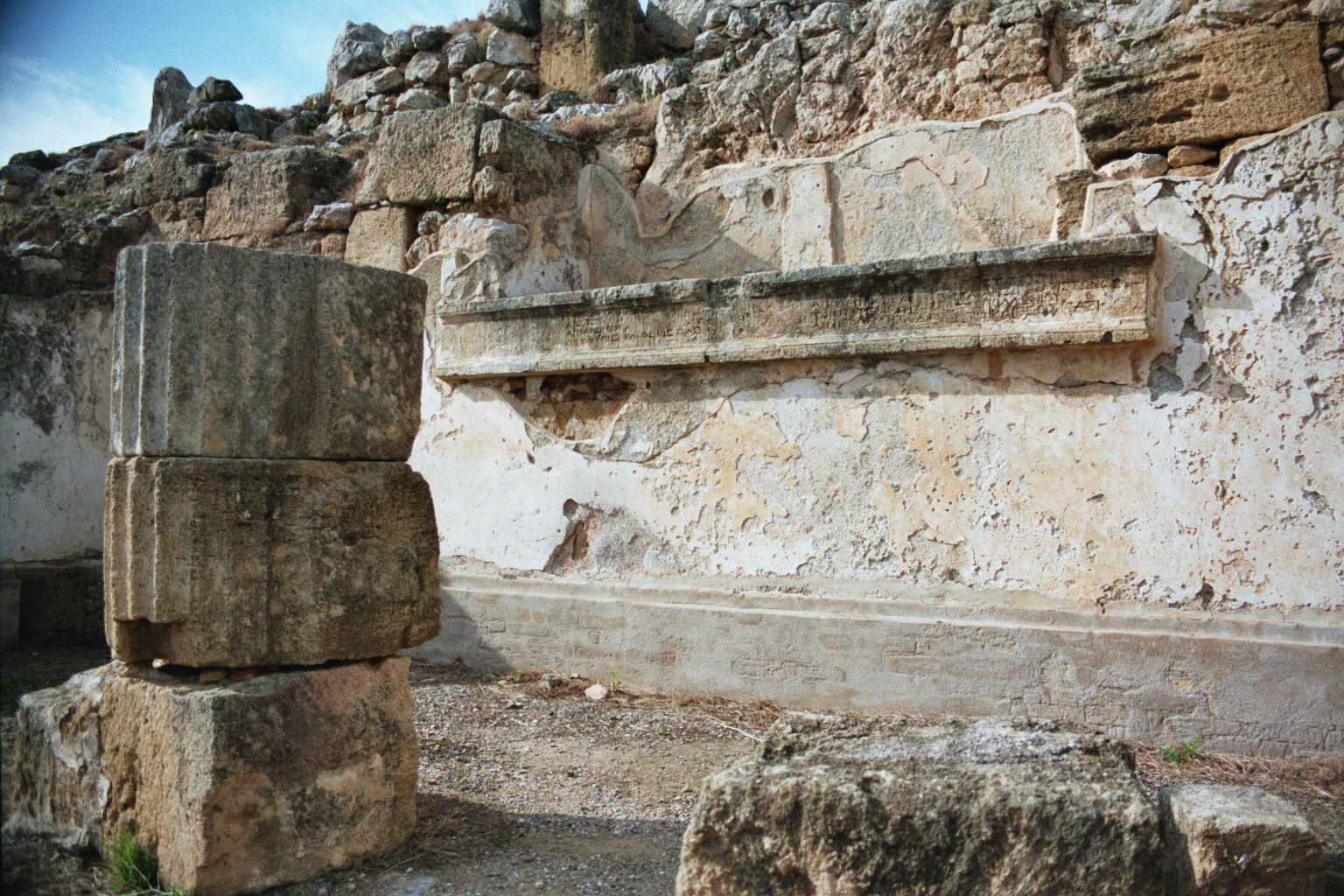
The exedra and inscription for Apollonius and Ariston

Left side:
ἐπὶ ἱεροθύτα Φίλωνος Ἀπ[ολλωνίου]
Ἀρίστω[ν] Ἀ[πολλωνίο]υ τὸν π[ατέρα]
Ἀπολλώνιον Ἀ[ρίστωνος ἀμ]φιπ[ολή]σα[ντα]
Διὶ Ὀλυμπίωι καὶ θεοῖς πᾶσι

Right side:
ἐπὶ ὶεροθύτα Φίλω[νος] Ἀρίστωνος
Ἀπολλώνιος καὶ Φ[ίλων] καὶ Ἀρίστων Ἀρίστωνος
τὸν πατέρα Ἀρίστ[ωνα Ἀ]πολλωνίου
ἀμφιπολήσαντα Διὶ Ὀλυμπίωι καὶ θεοῖς πᾶσι

— ISic001413
Translation:

Left side:
In the priesthood of Philon son of Apollonius,
Ariston son of Apollonius (set up this statue of) his father
Apollonius son of Ariston, who had been amphipolus
for Zeus Olympius and all the gods."

Right side:
"In the priesthood of Philon son of Apollonius,
Apollonius, Philon, and Ariston sons of Ariston (set up this statue of)
their father Ariston son of Apollonius,
who had been the amphipolus for Zeus Olympius and all the gods."

The original stoa on the site was probably built in the fourth or third century BC at the same time as the city was refounded, but the surviving remains derive from the second century BC.

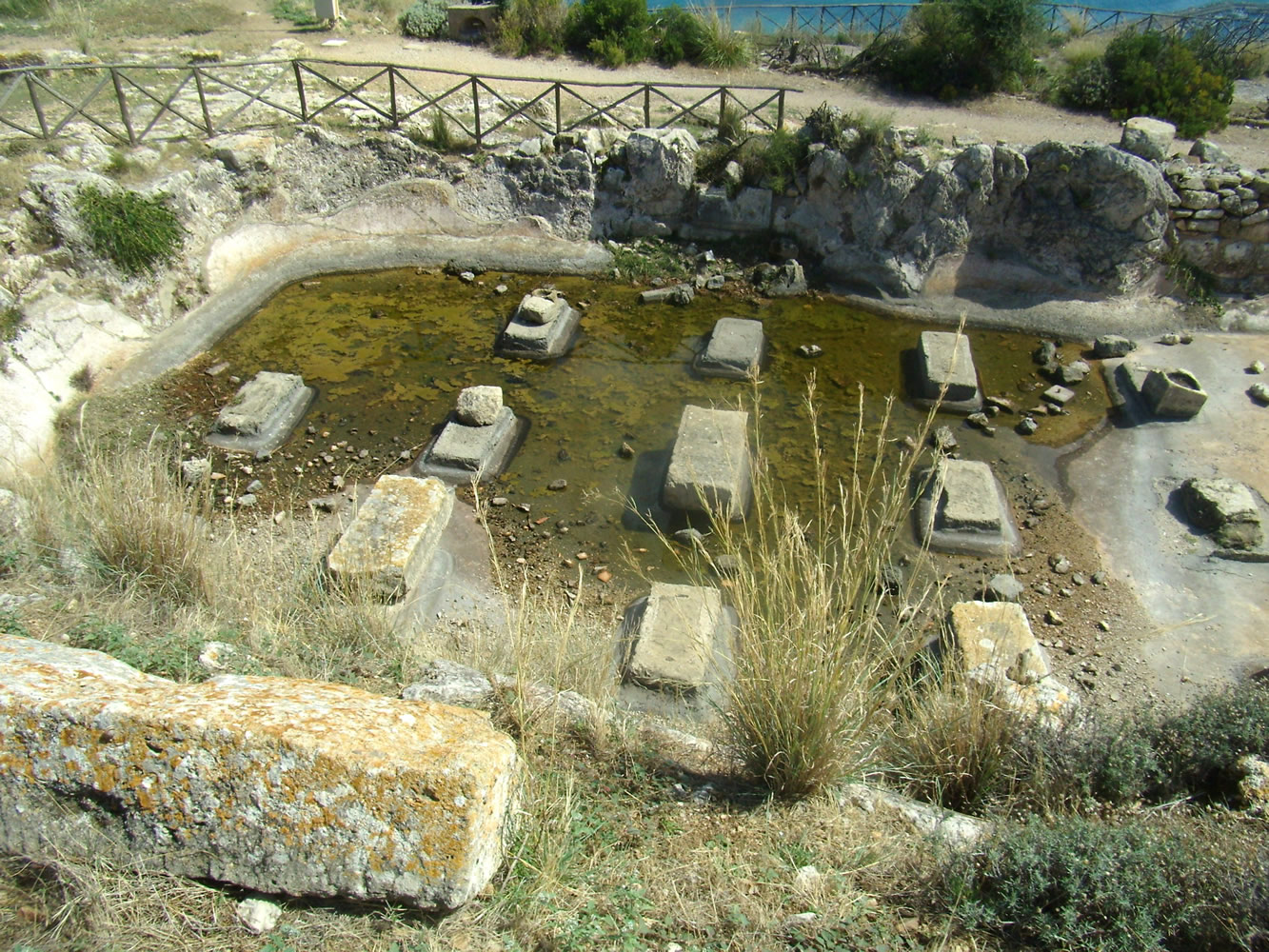
The great cistern by the Agora.

Behind the stoa was the bouleuterion, where the Council of the city met. The room has five rows of seating and space for around a hundred people. Older literature referred to the structure as an odeion (i.e., a music hall), while newer literature calls it a bouleuterion. Markus Wolf suggested that it served both functions. South of the bouleuterion is a large walled area, measuring 31.4 × 12.3 metres. Its function is unclear, but it might have been a religious precinct.

To the north of the agora is a gymnasium. The structure is not well preserved, but it had a large courtyard, which was flanked on the west side by columns. Under the floor were two large cisterns. Another large cistern is located next to the agora. It measures 25 × 10 metres, with nine rows of pillars, which previously supported a roof. This roof was probably part of the plaza of the agora. In the northeast of the agora there are very poorly preserved remains of another bathhouse from the Imperial period. It is only recognisable from the foundations since nothing of the superstructure survives.

==== Theater ====
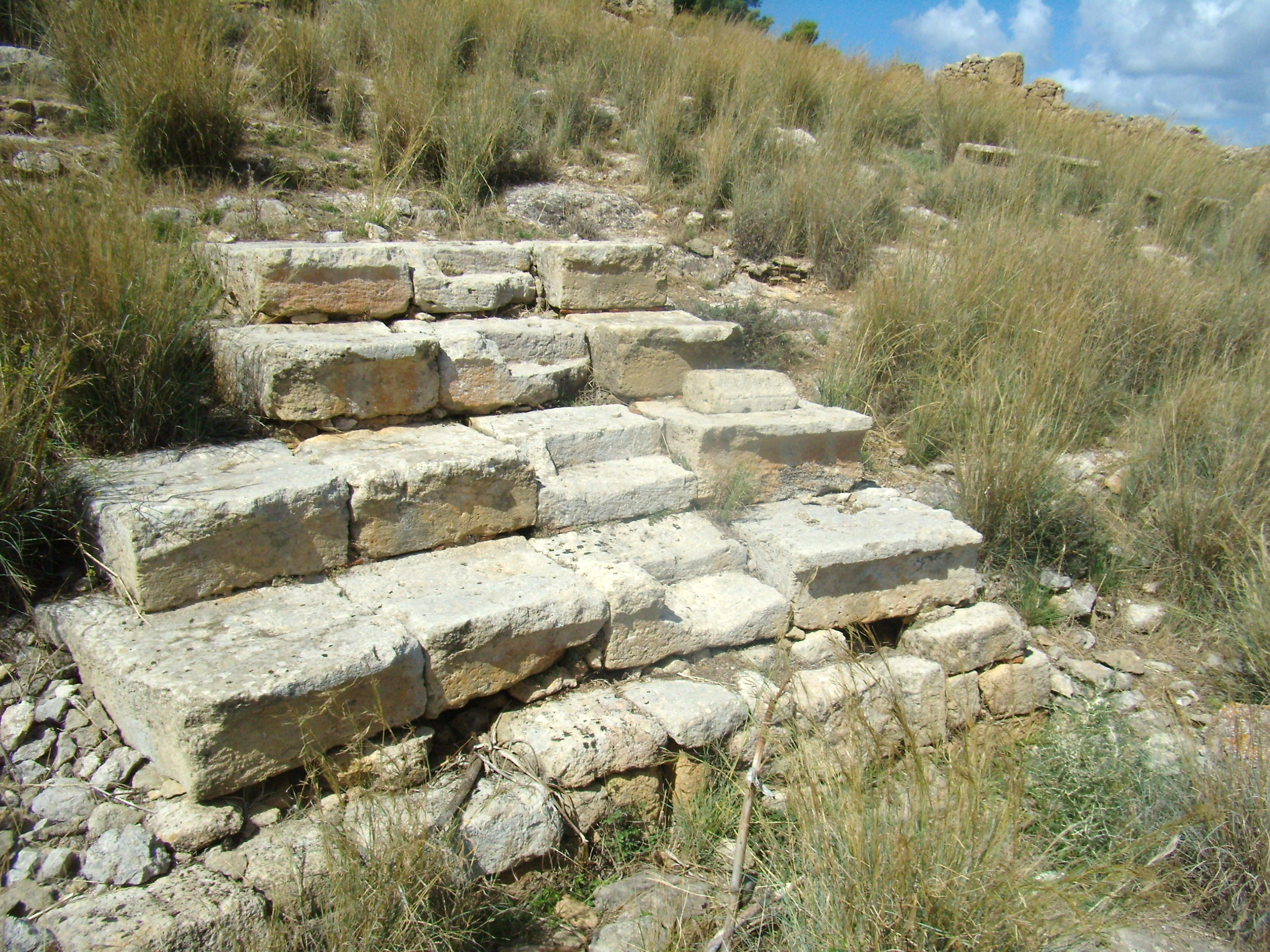
Remains of the seating in the theatre (modern reconstruction).

A theatre abutted the Agora, which was excavated in 1953 and 1958. It was probably built in the second century BC, during the period of Sicilian prosperity under the Roman Republic. The northern parts were built over the top of an older house. It appears that there was no theatre on the site before this date. The seating was built into the slope of Monte Catalfano, but little of it now survives. Some stones from the mid-section have been placed back together in a modern reconstruction. In total, there were twenty rows of seating.

From the skene (stage building), only parts of the foundation walls are still in situ, but along with scattered finds of architectural elements, it has been possible to reconstruct the building's appearance. It had an area of 21.6 × 6.6 metres and was two stories tall. At each end, there was a projecting wing, known as a paraskenion. Surviving architectural elements show that the stage building featured a set of doors and Doric columns on the ground floor and a facade of Ionic columns on the upper story. Two caryatids may have decorated the podium. The upper floor probably had balustrades decorated with a diamond pattern like those found in the stoa of the Agora. Two construction phases are detectable in the orchestra. The theatre probably remained in use until the city was abandoned.

==== Temples ====
There are remains of several temples in the city. None of them follow Classical Greek or Roman models. They seem to belong to the Punic tradition, although it is often difficult to find parallels for specific details.

Behind the bouleuterion and the theatre was a temple complex containing five shrines, arranged into a northern and southern pair, with the fifth shrine located in between them. Some shrines have niches at the western end, where statues would have stood. Three of these statues have been recovered.

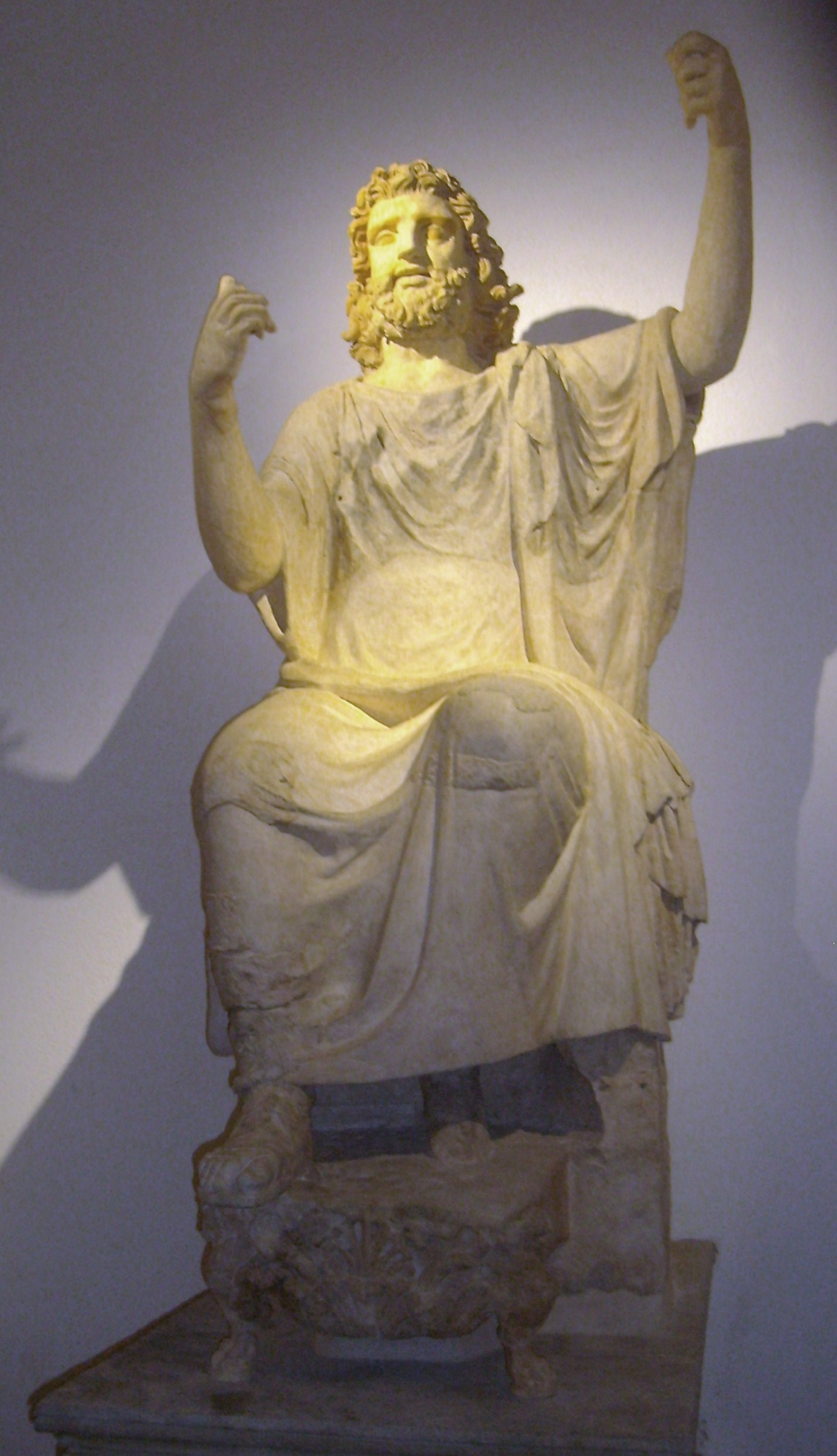
Colossal statue of Zeus / Baal from Soluntum (now in the Salinas Museum in Palermo).

The southernmost shrine contained an over life-sized statue, which depicted Zeus or Baal. It was discovered by Domenico Lo Faso Pietrasanta in 1826 and is now in the Archaeological Museum in Palermo. It is 1.65 metres high and made from local tufa. Most scholars date it to the second half of the second century BC. It shows that the city still contained wealthy citizens able to finance such works at that date.

The northern pair of shrines may be the source of a statue of Hermes (now lost) and an archaic-looking seated statue which might depict Astarte, Tanit, or Artemis. These shrines, now very poorly preserved, were also discovered by Domenico Lo Faso Pietrasanta in 1826 and have a ground area of 10.4 × 8.6 metres. The structure consisted of two cellae with benches on three sides and a courtyard in front.

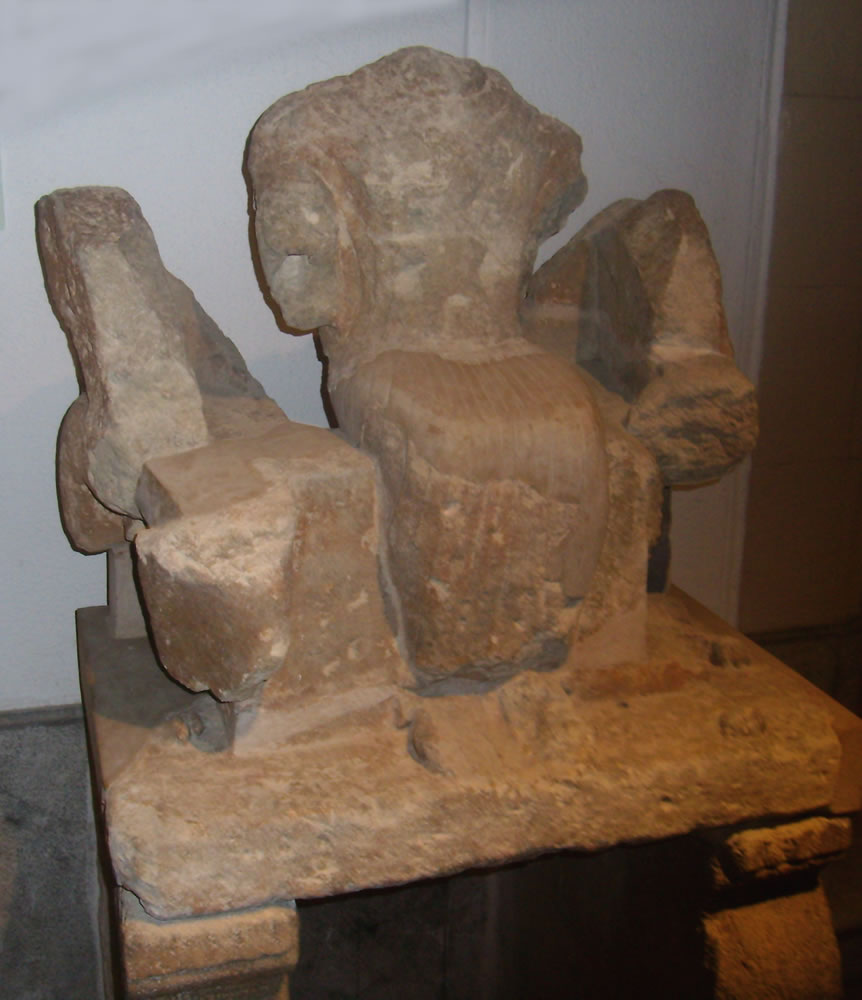
Seated statue of a goddess

The statue of the goddess is also now kept in the Archaeological Museum in Palermo. The figure is mode of local limestone and is heavily damaged. It depicts a goddess, sitting on a throne, flanked by two sphinxes. Originally, it was thought that the statue had belonged to a temple in the archaic city and was brought to Monte Catalfano after the destruction of the original city. Newer research has shown that the statue dates to ca. 350–250 BC and is based on Punic models.

At the entrance to the agora, on the western side of the Via dell'Agora, is another sanctuary (Insula VIII). It consists of a large house with an inner courtyard and three rooms on the street front. the southernmost of these rooms contains three high, pillar-shaped altars. The central room has a large entrance from the street and stone benches on all sides. It has been interpreted as a waiting room. The function of the third, northern room is unclear.

=== Houses ===
Two house types are identifiable. Large houses, mostly in the city centre, had two-story peristyles. At the edges of the city, there are smaller houses that had no peristyle, but a least a small courtyard. Due to the steep gradient of the cityscape, many houses had two or three stories.

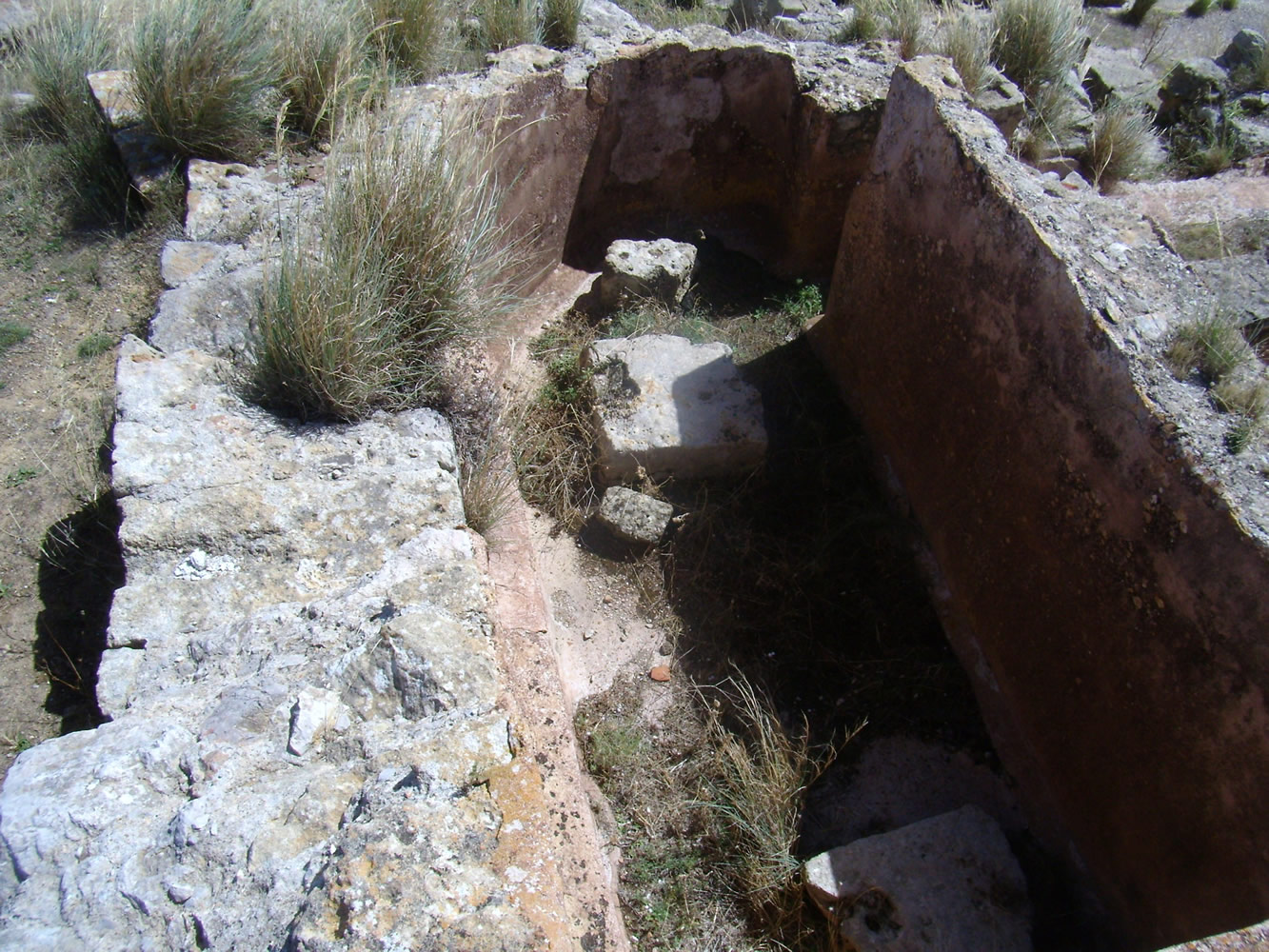
Cisterns in a house

The peristyle-type is typical of the houses of Soluntum, and similar houses are also known from other parts of northern Sicily. They developed in the years shortly after 300 BC. In other parts of the Greek world, they first appeared at later dates, so it appears that northern Sicily played a special role in the development of the type. The different levels of the houses were often used for different purposes. The shops on the lower floor of the houses in the centre of the city are usually not linked to the rest of the house but were used to support the floor above. On the first floor, there is often a peristyle and further living rooms. On the second floor, there are practical rooms like stables and kitchens. The facades of the wealthier houses were decorated with pilasters and half-columns. Nearly all houses had a cistern, which collected rainwater for the water supply.

The houses – like most buildings of the city – were built from two kinds of stone: hard grey dolomite from Monte Catalfano itself and a chalky sandstone from nearby quarries. The binding material was lime mortar. Several masonry techniques were used for the walls. The most common is "ladder masonry" in which small regular sandstone blocks and laid alongside large dolomite blocks and the space in between is filled with small rocks. The walls always had a double-shell design. "Block masonry" was often used, especially for the lower parts. In this technique, large dolomite blocks were laid one on top of the other. Regular sandstone blocks were mainly used in facades. Older structures used the opus africanum technique, in which the stones were placed between individual pillars. The roofs of the houses used terracotta tiles.

==== The "Gymnasium" ====
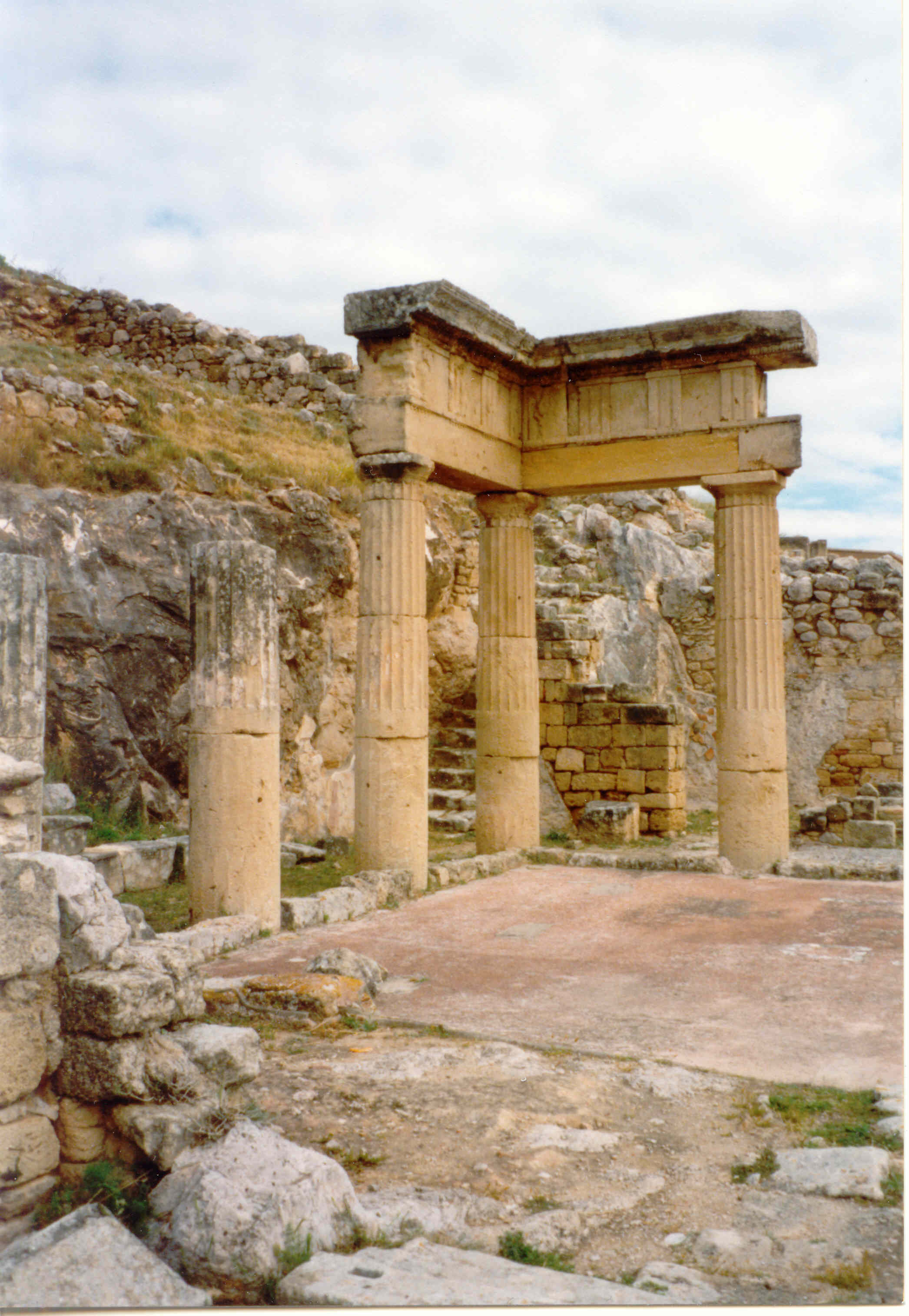
Peristyle in the so-called "Gymnasium".

The so-called "Gymnasium" (Italian: Ginnasio) in Insula V on the Via dell'Agora (the main street) was a private house, which was probably built in the third century BC and was inhabited until the third century AD. Several phases of construction and renovation are detectable. On the side of the house facing the street, there are four stores, each with two rooms, which were probably rented out.

The house stands on a steep slope, so the main floor, with the peristyle and various small rooms, is the first floor. The entrance was on a side street. Parts of the second story are also preserved. It is located on the upper part of the slope and was previously accessed from the peristyle using a set of stairs.

The name is modern and inaccurate since the structure was never used as a gymnasium. It was given to the house because a Greek inscription was found there during excavations in 1865, with a dedication for a gymnasiarch, but this inscription did not originally stand in the house. The structure is a large house with a two-story peristyle. In the 19th century, six columns of this peristyle were re-erected and various parts of the building were reconstructed. The house is the main focus of Markus Wolf's 2003 monograph on the houses of Soluntum.

==== House of Leda ====
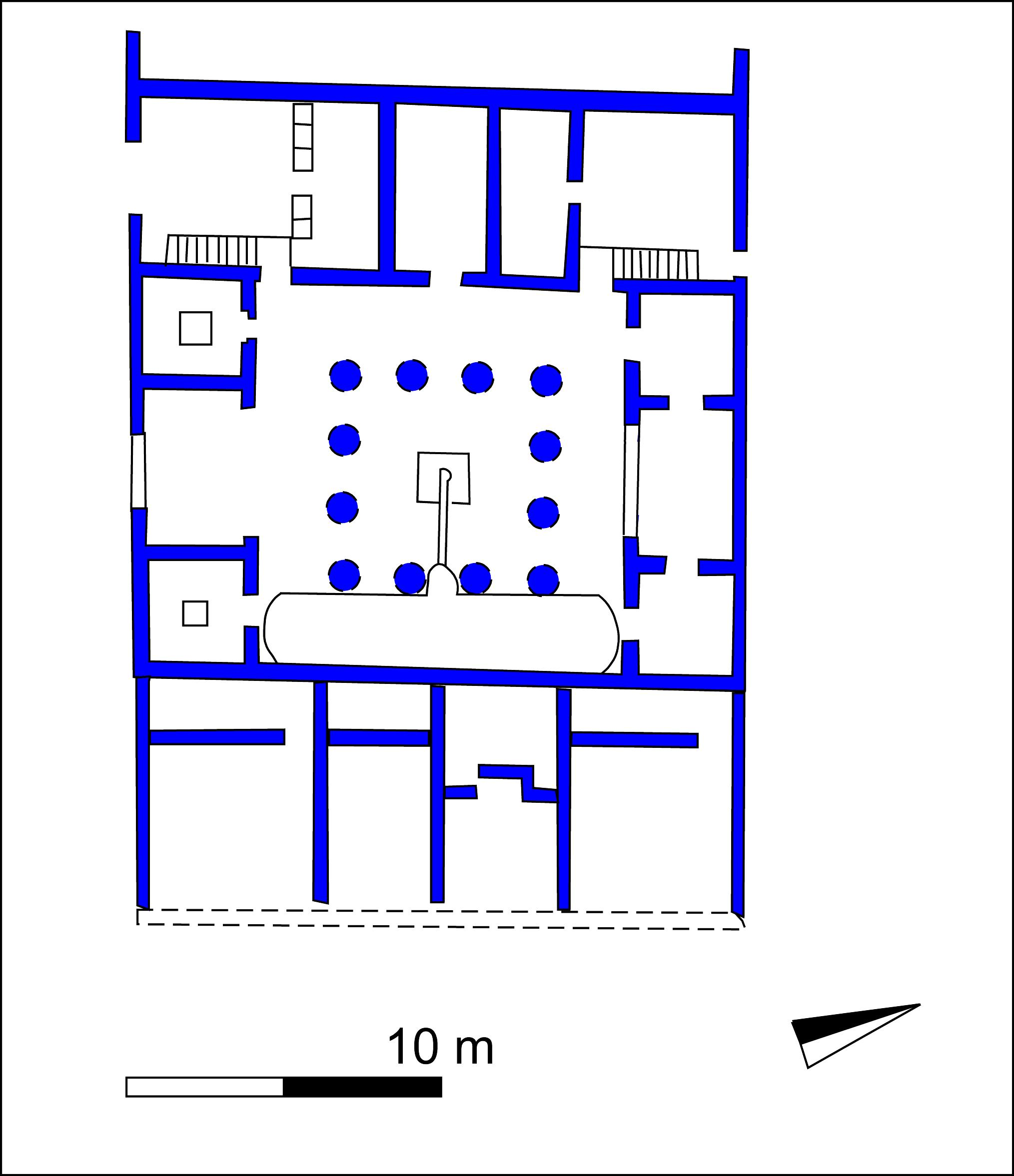
Groundplan of the House of Leda

The House of Leda (Italian: Casa di Leda) in Insula VII, is derived from its wall paintings, which included a depiction of Leda. The house is located on the Via dell'Agora and was excavated in 1963 by Vincenzo Tusa. It measures 26.7 × 19.5 metres, giving a floorspace of about 520 m^{2}. There are four shops on the street front, but their facade is completely lost. The central two shops were narrower than the outer two. All of them probably also had an upper floor, since remains of staircases are preserved, as are benches and various other furnishings.

The main house was entered from a side street to the south, now known as Via Ippodamo da Mileto. The centre of the house was originally a two-story peristyle with four Ionic columns on each side; this is only partially preserved. The floor of the peristyle is 5.65 metres above the floor level of the shops. On the east side of the peristyle is a cistern that stretches the entire length of the courtyard. In the middle is a pool decorated with a geometric mosaic, which collected rainwater and fed into the cistern. The whole peristyle is decorated with a simple mosaic.

In the centre of the west side of the courtyard was the triclinium (dining room), with wall paintings which are relatively well preserved. Their date is disputed. Initially, they were dated to the end of the first century AD, and assigned to the Roman fourth style. More recent research prefers to place them in the first century BC and assign them to the second style. The paintings consist of plain fields with individual figures in the centre, one of which is Leda with the swan. The wall paintings replaced an original set of paintings in the first style. Other rooms of the house also have wall paintings. The floors were partially decorated with geometric mosaics. In one room south of the peristyle, there is a mosaic depicting an armillary sphere, a type of astronomical instrument. The individual lines of the image are marked out using lead strips. The excavator suggested that it was imported from Alexandria in Egypt. Many statues have been found in the house. A large room accessed from the Via Ippodamo da Mileto contained stone troughs, which indicates that it was used as a stable.

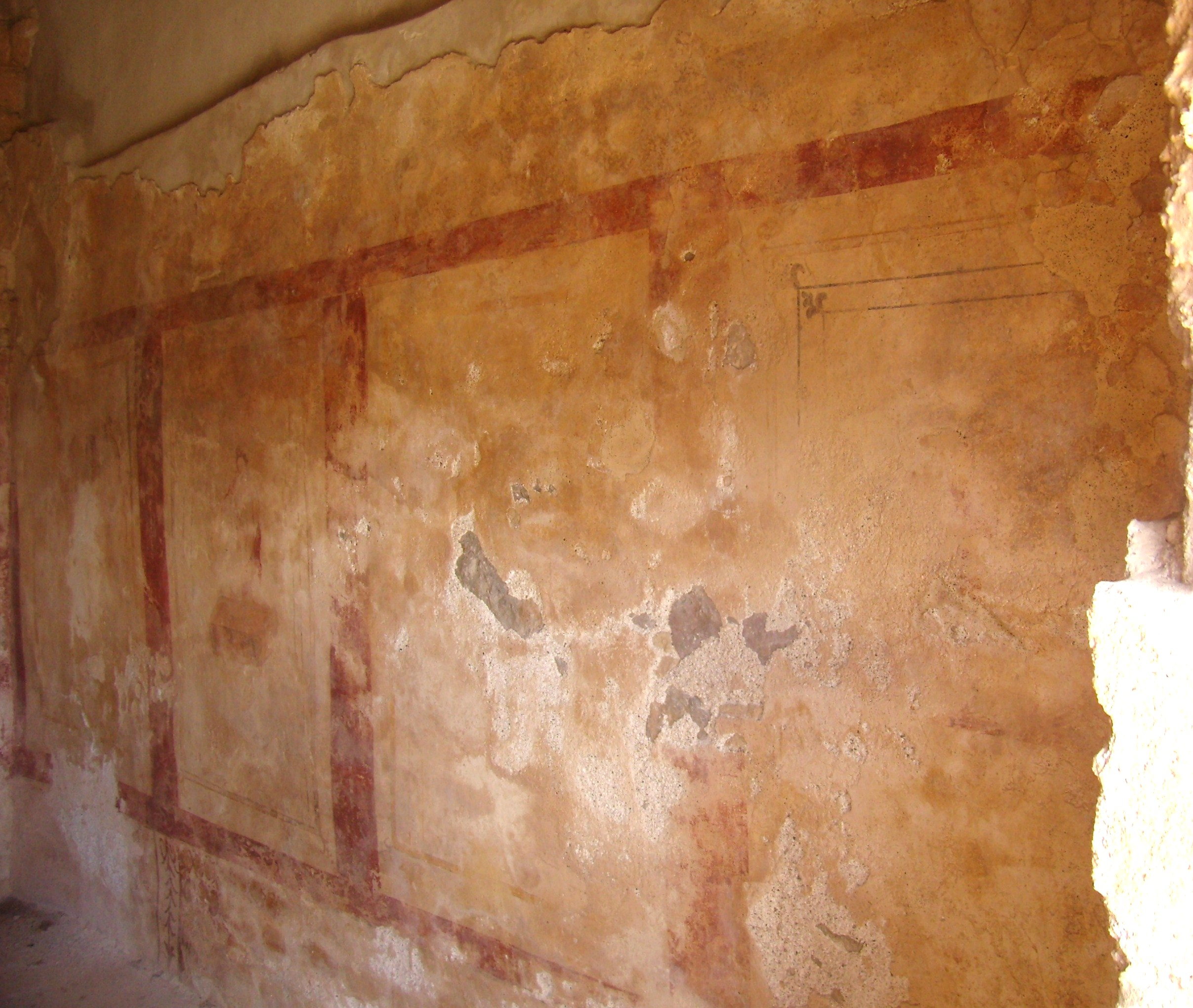
Wall paintings in the House of Leda

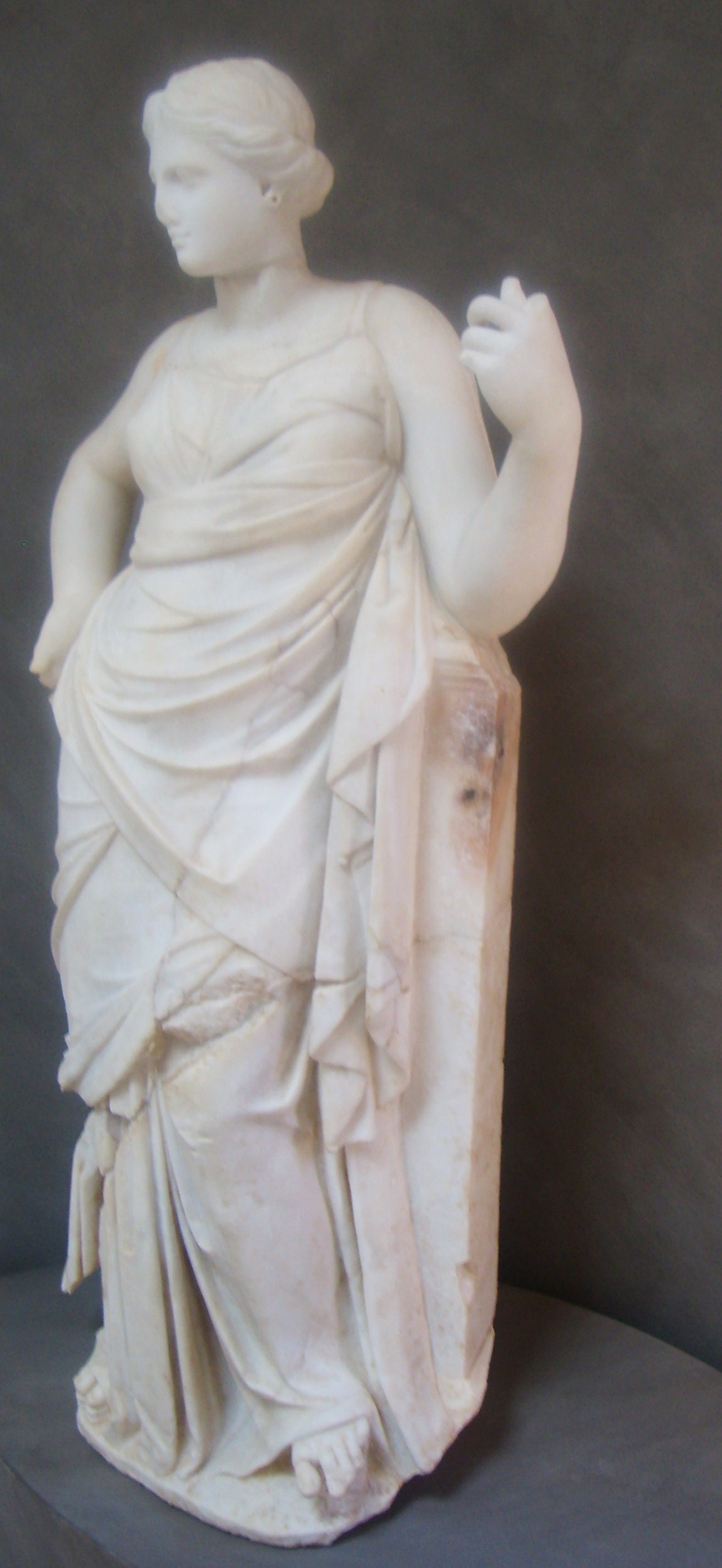
Statue of a Muse from the House of Leda

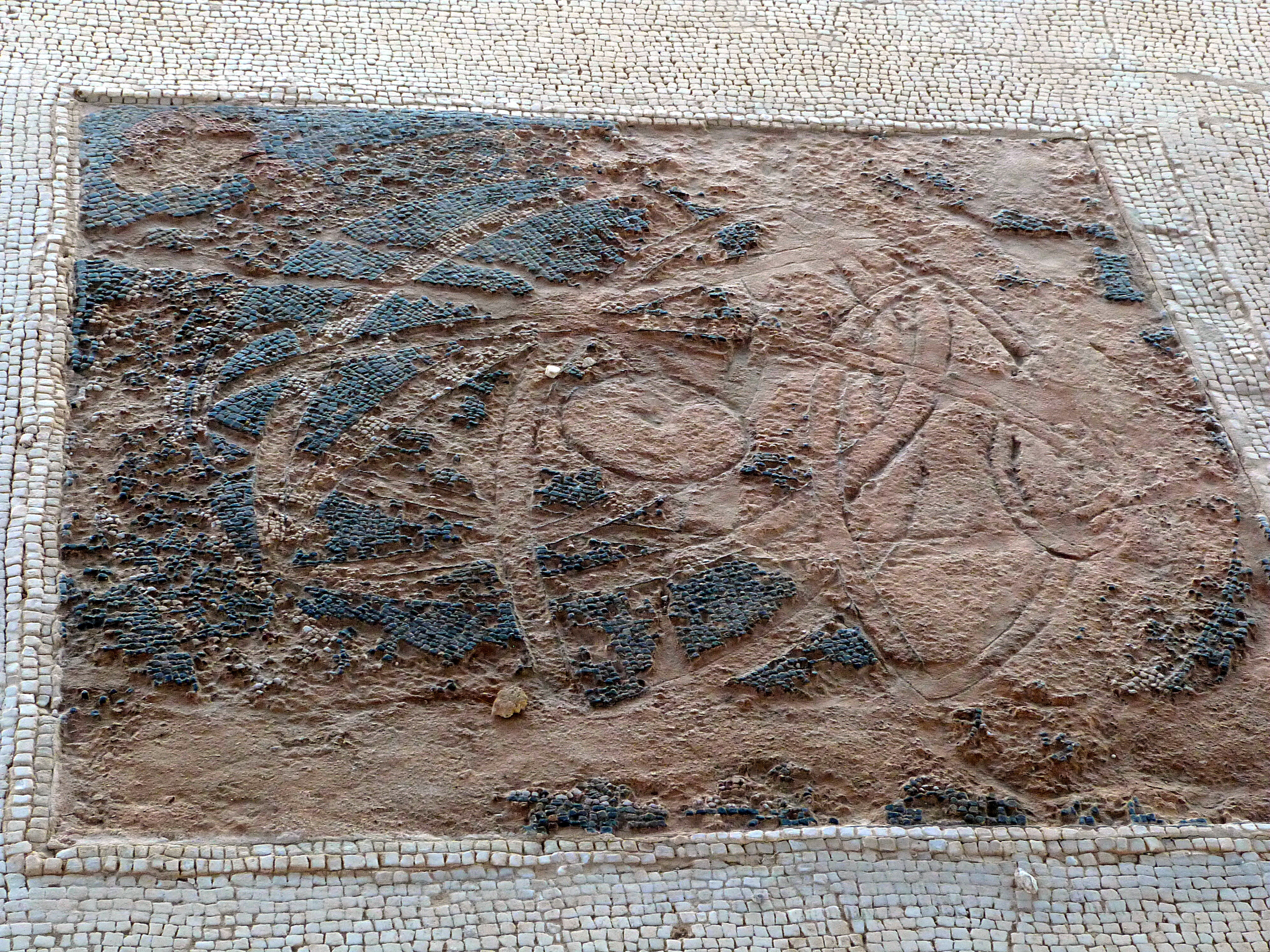
Mosaic of an armillary sphere from the House of Leda

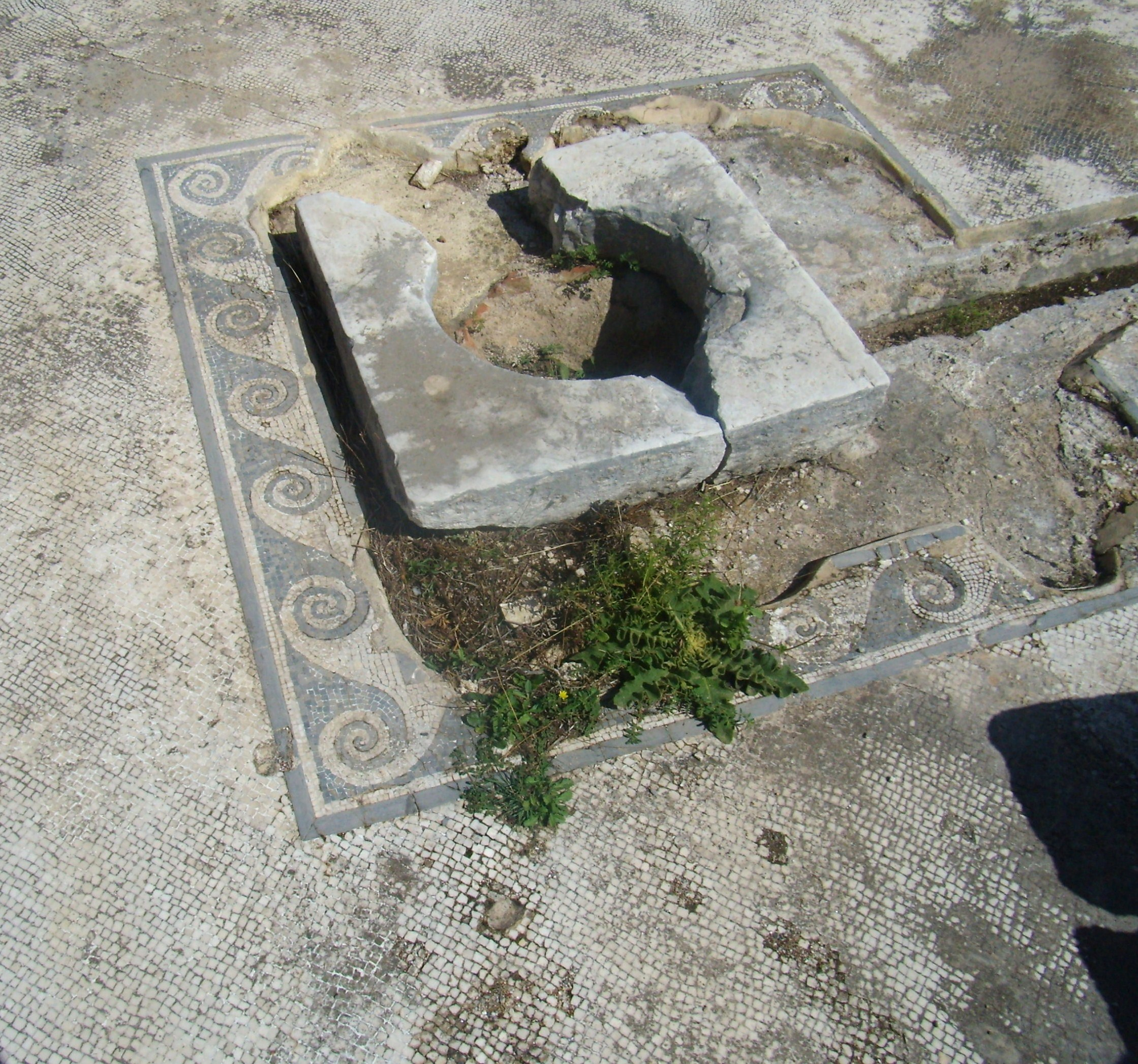
Mosaic and basin for collecting rainwater in the peristyle

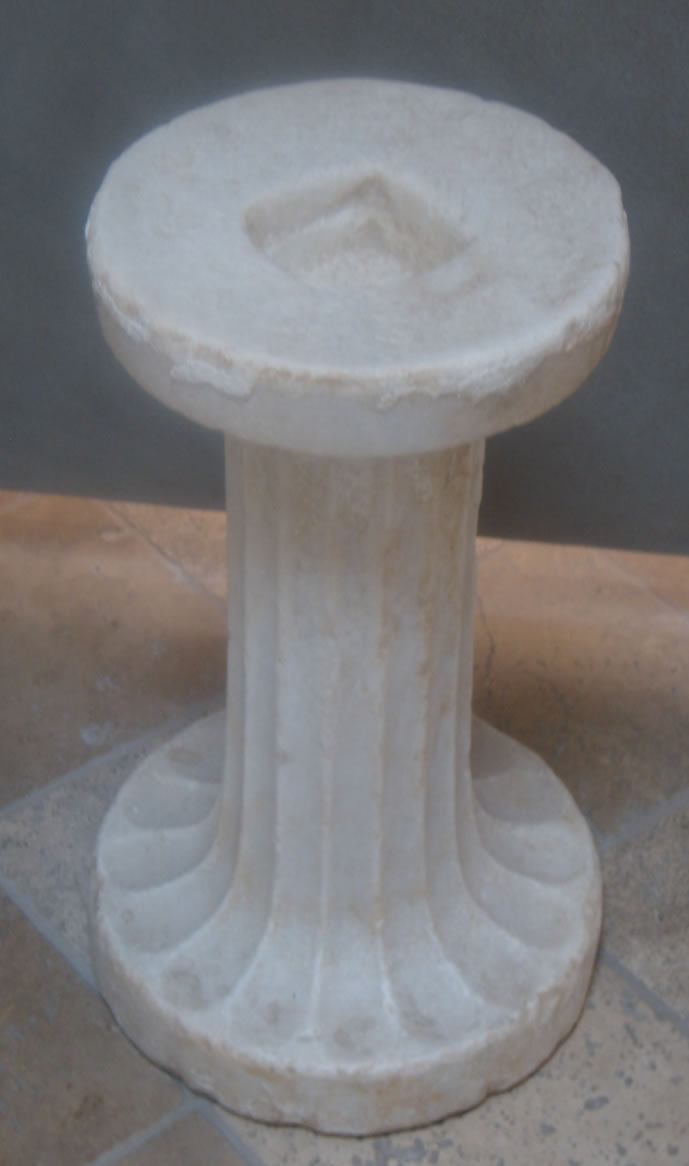
Foot of a basin

==== House of the Masks ====
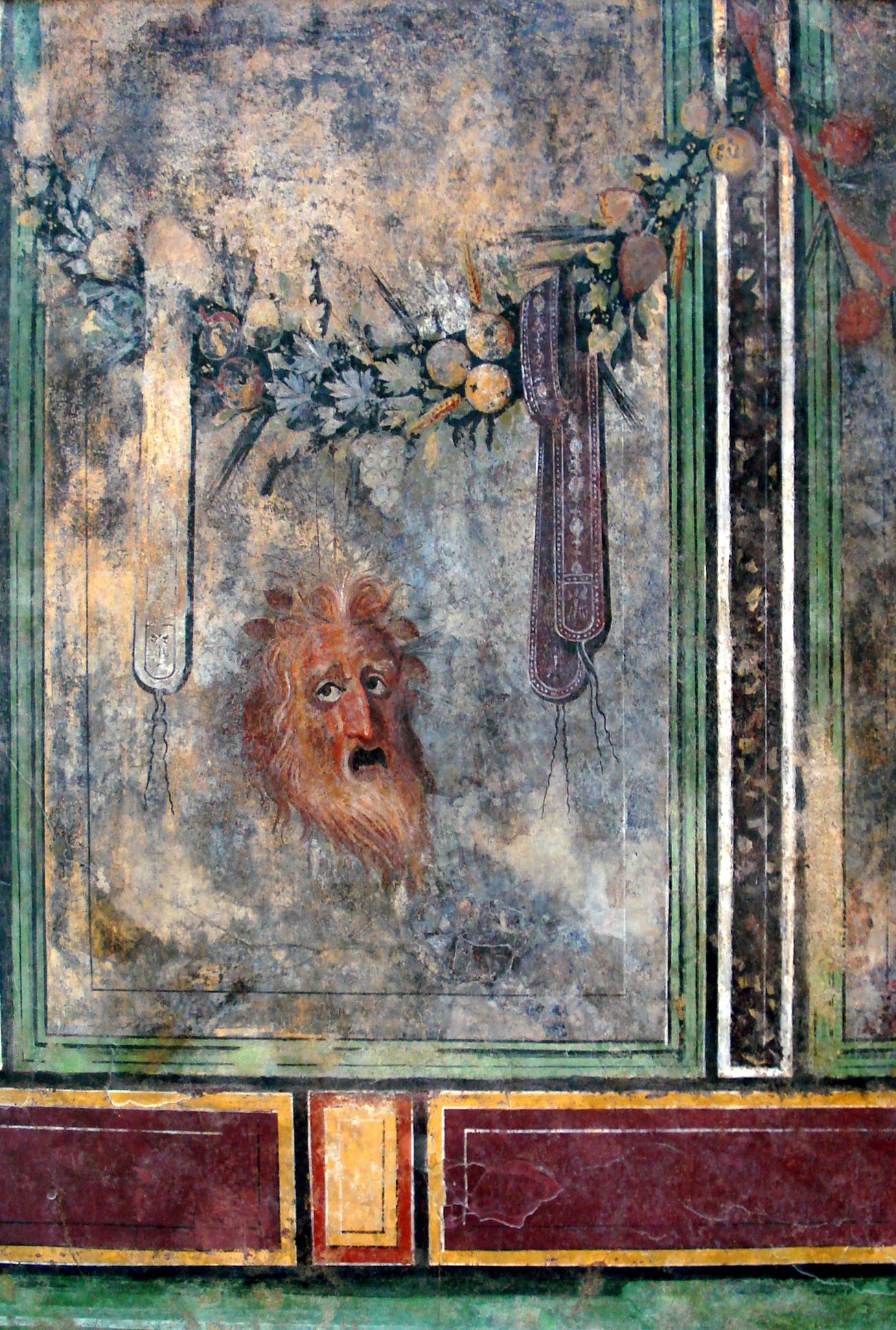
Wall paintings from the House of the Masks

The House of the Masks (Italian: Casa delle Maschere) in Insula XI was partially excavated in 1868–1869. It is located at the high point of the whole city. A atrium stood at the centre, with a peristyle to the east. On the east side of the house was a kind of veranda with a view over the city to the sea. In one room of the house there are well-preserved wall paintings in the second style, dating to the first century BC. These paintings mimic the appearance of blocks of coloured marble, with garlands above and theatre masks hanging off them. These paintings are now kept in the Antonino Salinas Archaeological Museum in Palermo.

==== House of Harpocrates ====
The House of Harpocrates (Italian: Casa di Arpocrate) in Insula VI gets its name from a bronze statue of the Egyptian god Harpocrates which was found there. The building measures 20.3–20.6 × 17.5–21.8 metres and has a floorspace of 404 m^{2}. It was excavated by Vincenzo Tusa in 1970. This house two has multiple stories as a result of the slope of the hill. The main entrance was in the north and could be accessed from the side street known as the Via Hppodamo da Mileto. From the entrance, one proceeded to a vestibule and then into a peristyle court supported by four Doric columns on the lower floor and four more on a second (reconstructed) floor. The peristyle measures 7.3 × 10.1 metres – small by comparison with the peristyles of other houses in the city. The courtyard was originally two stories tall. opposite the entrance was the exedra, the main room of the house, which was decorated with a geometric mosaic, that shows a circle with a maeander frame. There are traces of wall paintings. A room to the west of the peristyle contains a cistern. On the east side of the peristyle is a staircase which previously led to the second floor.

==== House of the Garlands ====
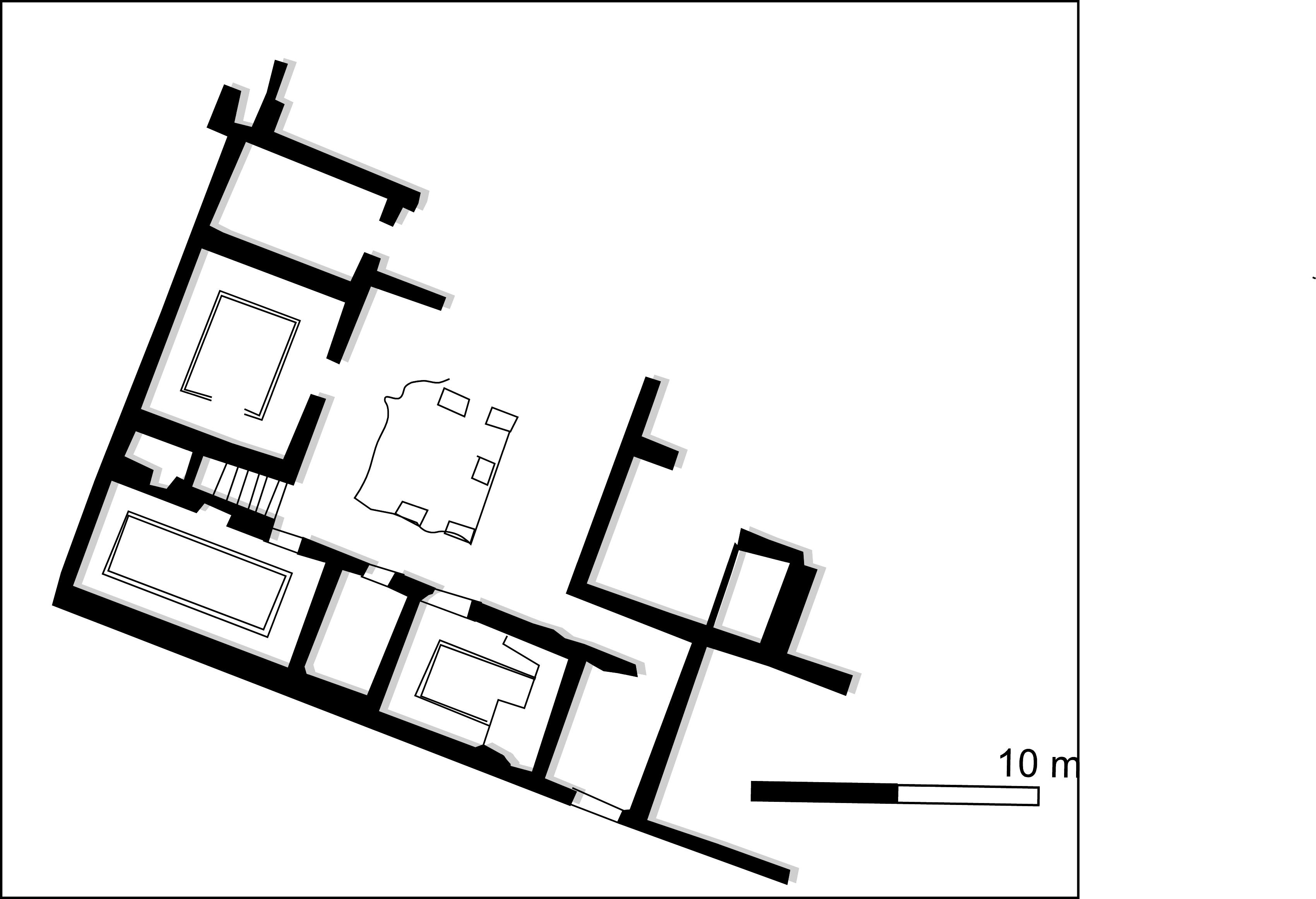
House of the Garlands, plan

The House of the Garlands (Italian: Casa delle Ghirlande) in Insula X is right at the northern end of the city, north of the Agora and most of the other excavated buildings. It has a peristyle court which leads to other rooms. Part of the structure has been lost to erosion. At the time of its discovery, the house had well-preserved wall paintings in one room, in the late Augustan second style, depicting a series of candelabra with garlands on a late background (whence the house's name). Traces of more second-style paintings are found in another room, in this case, imitating marble cladding. All of these paintings are now heavily weathered. Some floors with simple black-and-white mosaics are preserved. A small decorated altar with the Punic Tanit symbol was found inside the house, which testifies to the mixture of Punic and Roman culture in the community.

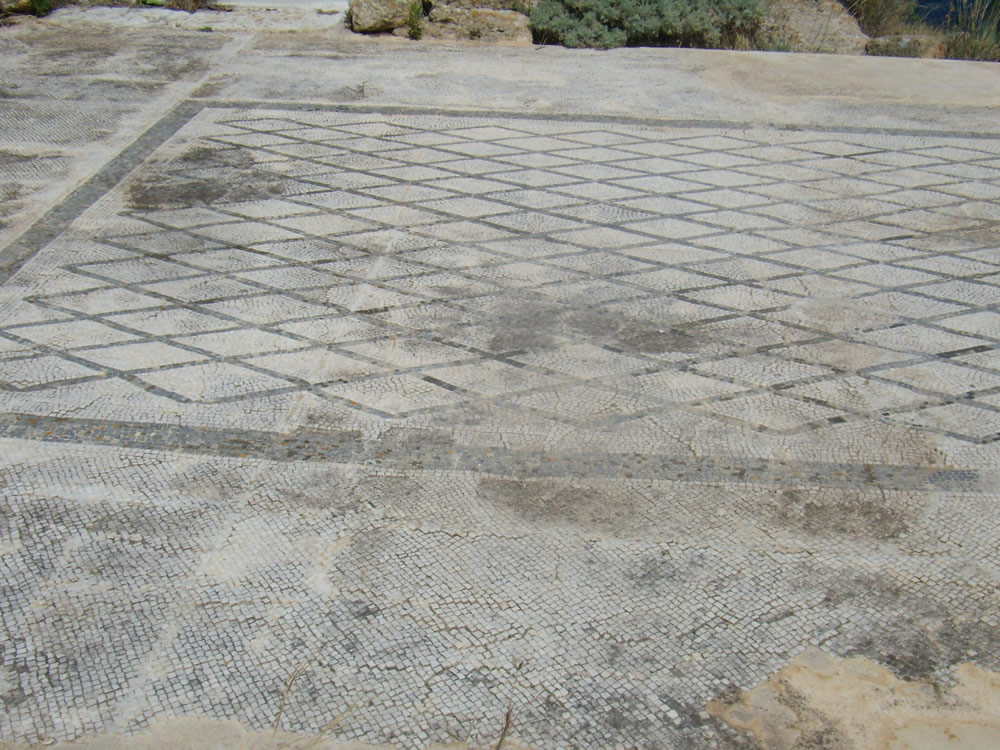
House of the Garlands, mosaic

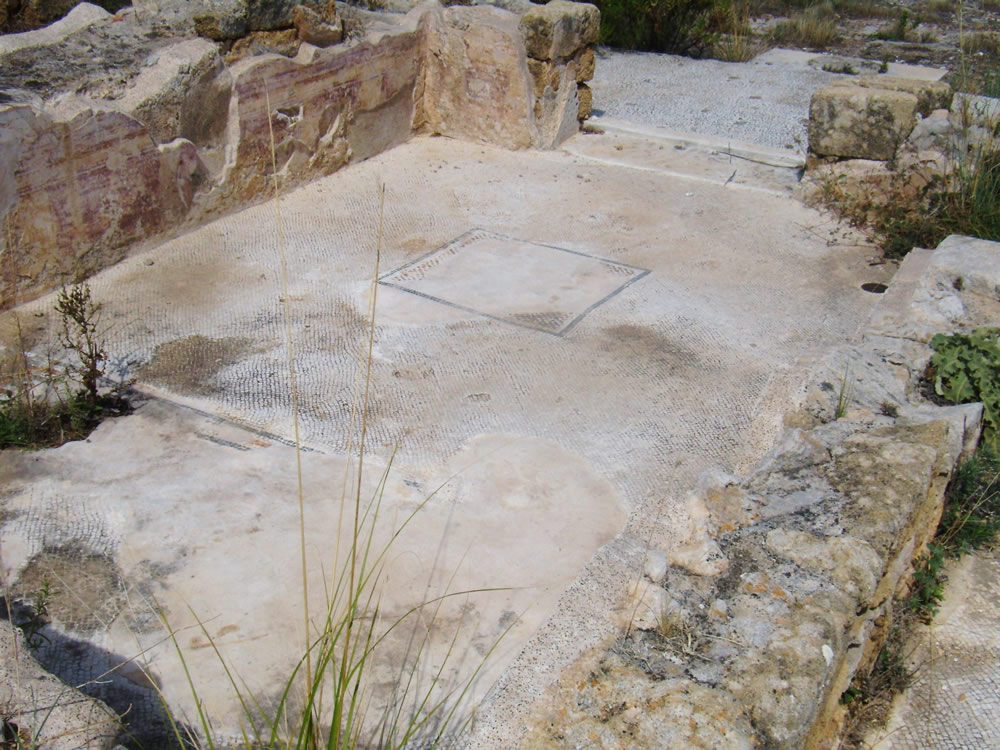
House of the Garlands, mosaic

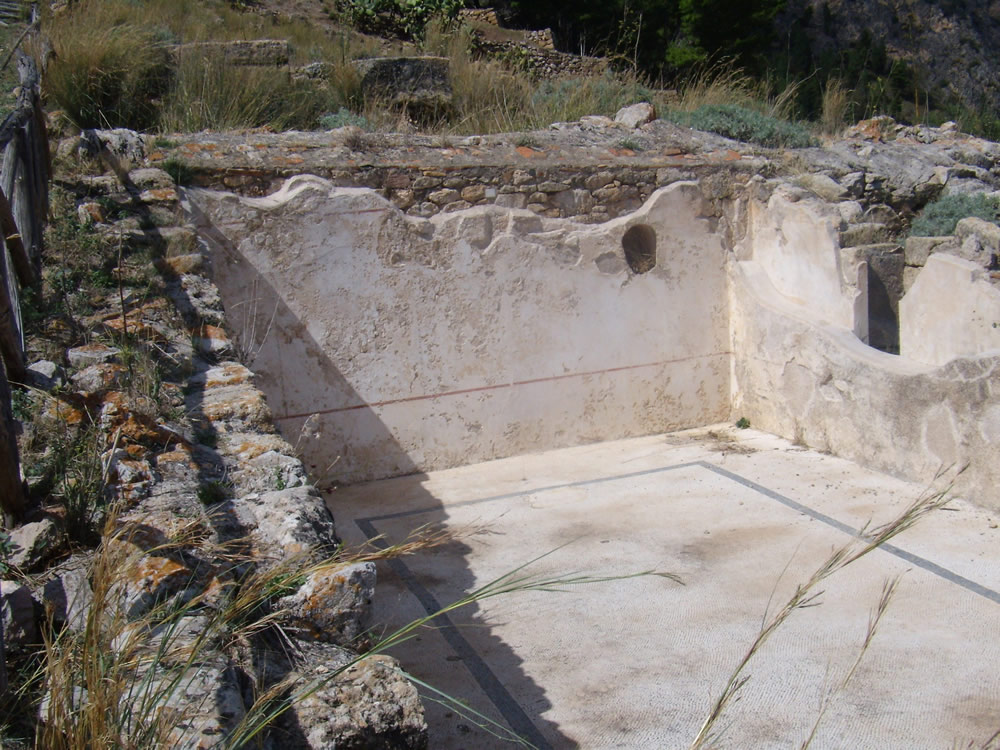
House of the Garlands, mosaic and remnants of wall paintings

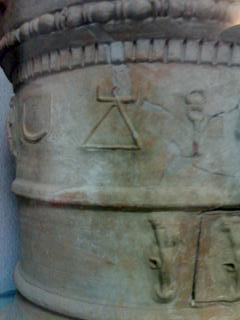
Altar with Tanit symbol

==== Courtyard House ====
The Courtyard House (Italian: Casa a Cortile) in Insula VII is a comparatively small house with a rather different plan from the large peristyle houses. This structure measures 12–14 × 19.5 metres and covers around 250 m^{2}. The entrance is on the south side, on the side street known as the Via Ippodamo da Mileto. From there one enters a large entrance room. To the left of this is a stable, with stone feeding troughs still in situ. To the north of the entrance room a small courtyard with a single Doric column in the centre. Off this courtyard are further rooms. This house was certainly two stories high, as shown above all by the surviving column remains which would have supported the upper floor.

==== Others ====
A few buildings appear to have been purely commercial. People surely lived and worked throughout the city and in designated quarters. In the northwest, in particular, there are many smaller houses, which were probably the residences of craftsmen. The excavator Vincenzo Tusa referred to this sector as the "craftsmen's quarter." Millstones have been found in many houses. Insula 13, at the highest part of the city, contained the remains of a building with an open courtyard with four rooms to the west, one of which contained an oven. Near the top of the town are some cisterns cut in the rock.

=== Necropoleis ===
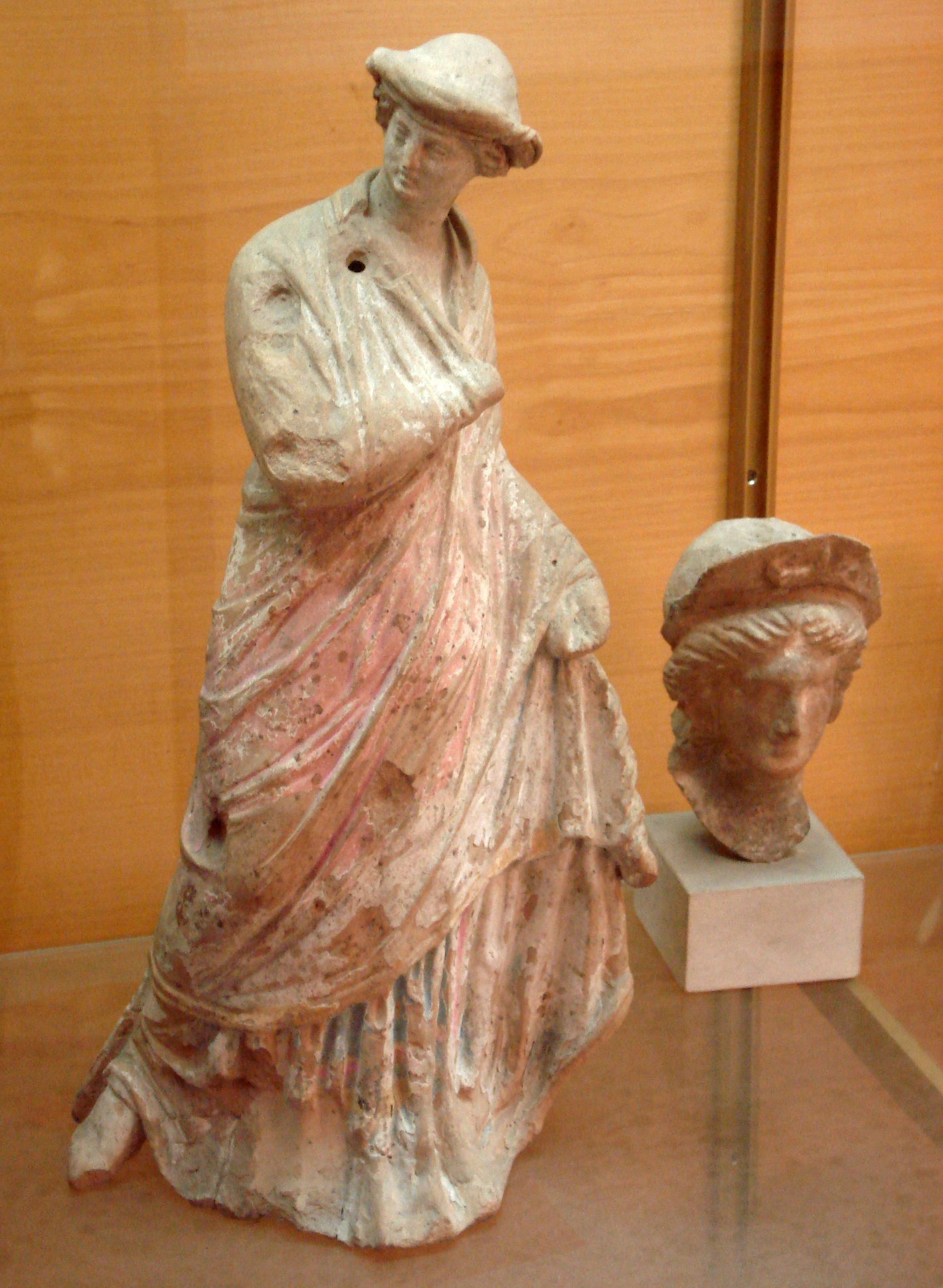
Hellenistic terracotta figurine from a grave at Soluntum.

Necropoleis were found during the excavations at the foot of Monte Catalfani, very near the modern train station of Santa Flavia. The tombs are typically Punic grave chambers cut into the cliff face, with a staircase for access. Long rectangular niches in the walls and floor were intended for burials. These graves date to the fourth and third centuries BC. Tanagra figurines were a common grave good.

== Present state ==
Until 2009, visitors were only allowed to visit the Antiquarium, which had an exhibition of various finds from the site, with a description of the architecture and information on the lives of the city's inhabitants. Since 2009, the excavated area has been open to visitors as the Archaeological Park of Soluntum (Italian: Parco Archeologico di Solunto). In 2014, it had around 10,000 visitors. The closest train station, Santa Flavia-Solunto-Porticello, on the Palermo-Agrigento-Porto Empedocle railway line, is about 2 km from the park. The preservation of the ruins is a serious conservation challenge. Many of the wall paintings which were uncovered in the mid-20th century have now been destroyed by the elements. The second style paintings, which were discovered in the 19th century, are better preserved since they were removed from the walls and placed into the excavation storerooms immediately after discovery. They are now on display in the museum. Even the preservation of the masonry is a challenge since the local building stone is very crumbly.

== Bibliography ==
- This article incorporates text from a publication now in the public domain: Ashby, Thomas (1911). "Soluntum". In Chisholm, Hugh (ed.). Encyclopædia Britannica. Vol. 25 (11th ed.). Cambridge University Press. p. 368.
- This article incorporates text from a publication now in the public domain: Bunbury, Edward Herbert (1857). "So'lus or Soluntum". In Smith, William (ed.). Dictionary of Greek and Roman Geography. London: John Murray.
- Amadasi Guzzo, Maria Giulia (2012). "Phoenician and Punic in Sicily". In Tribulato, Olga (ed.). Language and Linguistic Contact in Ancient Sicily. Cambridge University Press. pp. 115–131. ISBN 978-1-107-02931-6.
- Calascibetta, Alba Maria Gabriella (2009). "Nuovi Dati Sulla Necropoli Soluntina". In Ampolo, C. (ed.). Immagine e Immagini della Sicilia e di altre Isole del Mediterraneo Antico. Pisa: Edizioni della Normale. pp. 2.633–644.
- Calascibetta, Alba Maria Gabriella; Di Leonardo, Laura (2012). "Un nuovo documento epigrafico da Solunto". In Ampolo, Carmine (ed.). Sicilia occidentale. Studi, rassegne, ricerche. Pisa. pp. 37–48. ISBN 978-88-7642-451-9.
- Chiarenza, Nicola (2013). "On Oriental Persistence in the Hellenic Town of Soluntum: a New Hypothesis about the Statue of an Enthroned Goddess". In Bombardieri, L.; D’Agostino, A.; Guarducci, G.; Orsi, V.; Valentini, S. (eds.). SOMA 2012, Identity and Connectivity, Proceedings of the 16th Symposium on Mediterranean Archaeology, Florence, Italy, 1–3 March 2012. Oxford. pp. 945–954. ISBN 9781407312057.
- De Vos, Mariette (1975). "Pitture e mosaico a Solunto". Bulletin Antieke Beschaving. 50: 195–224.
- Furcas, Giovanii Luca (2019). "Sistemi di approvvigionamento idrico e drenaggio pubbico nella Sicilia Ellenistica". In Trümper, Monika; Adornato, Gianfranco; Lappi, Thomas (eds.). Cityscapes of Hellenistic Sicily. Roma: Edizioni Quasar. pp. 327–348. ISBN 978-88-5491-002-7.
- Gandolfo, L. (2003). "Note sulla Circolazione Monetaria Soluntina". In Corretti, Alessandro (ed.). Quarte Giornate Internazionali di Studi Sull'Aera Elima: Erice, 1-4 dicembre 2000. 3: Atti. Pisa u.a. pp. 549–555. ISBN 978-88-7642-122-8.
- Head, Barclay; et al. (1911), "Zeugitana", Historia Numorum (2nd ed.), Oxford: Clarendon Press, pp. 877–882.
- Lang, Jörn (2022). "Hellenistisch-römische Wohnkultur in der ersten römischen Provinz – Häuser in Solunt im Spiegel ihrer dauerhaften Ausstattung: Mit Beiträgen von Melanie Lang und Julika Steglich". Jahrbuch des Deutschen Archäologischen Instituts: 39–140. doi:10.34780/32az-v1cm.
- Lappi, Thomas (2019). "Unpublizierte Stuckfragmente von Wanddekorationen Ersten Stils aus dem späthellenistischen Solunt". In Trümper, Monika; Adornato, Gianfranco; Lappi, Thomas (eds.). Cityscapes of Hellenistic Sicily. Roma: Edizioni Quasar. pp. 263ß287. ISBN 978-88-5491-002-7.
- Portale, Elisa Chiara (2006). "Problemi dell'archeologia della Sicilia Ellenistico-Romana: Il caso di Solunto". Archeologica Classica. 57: 49–114.
- Portale, Elisa Chiara (2019). "Scultura ellenistica e paesaggio urbano: i casi di Tindari e Solunto". In Trümper, Monika; Adornato, Gianfranco; Lappi, Thomas (eds.). Cityscapes of Hellenistic Sicily. Roma: Edizioni Quasar. pp. 239–263. ISBN 978-88-5491-002-7.
- Sposito, Alberto (2001). Morgantina e Solunto: analisi e problemi conservativi (in Italian). Palermo: DPCE.
- Sposito, Alberto (2014). Solunto: paesaggio città architettura. Roma: "L'Erma" di Bretschneider. ISBN 978-88-913-0899-3.
- Tusa, V. (2001). "La statua del cosiddetto Zeus di Solunto". Zona Archeologica: Festschrift für Hans Peter Isler zum 60. Geburtstag. Habelt. pp. 433–438. ISBN 9783774930735.
- Wiegand, Armin (1997). Das Theater von Solunt: ein besonderer Skenentyp des Späthellenismus auf Sizilien. Mainz am Rhein: von Zabern. ISBN 9783805320351.
- Wilson, Roger J. A. (2000). "Ciceronian Sicily: an archaeological perspective". In Smith, Christopher John; Serrati, John (eds.). Sicily from Aeneas to Augustus. Edinburgh: Edinburgh University Press. pp. 134–160. ISBN 0-7486-1367-6.
- Wilson, Roger J. A. (2013). "Hellenistic Sicily, 270–100 BC". In Prag, Jonathan R. W.; Quinn, Josephine Crawley (eds.). The Hellenistic West: Rethinking the Ancient Mediterranean. Cambridge: Cambridge University Press. pp. 79–119. ISBN 978-1-107-03242-2.
- Wolf, Markus (2003). Die Häuser von Solunt und die hellenistische Wohnarchitektur. Mainz: P. von Zabern. ISBN 978-3-8053-3267-5.
- Wolf, Markus (2013). Die Agora von Solunt: Öffentliche Gebäude und öffentliche Räume des Hellenismus im griechischen Westen. Wiesbaden: Reichert Verlag. ISBN 978-3-89500-726-2.
