= Tusa =

Tusa may refer to:

== Locations ==
- La Tusa, slang for Tucson, Arizona, originating from Mexican American communities rooted in Chicano border culture of the Southwest United States
- Tusa, Iran, an ancient city in northeastern Iran
- Tusa, Sicily, a comune in the province of Messina, Sicily, Italy
- Tusa, a village in the commune of Sâg, Romania
- Tušice (Hungarian Tusa), a village in the Michalovce district of eastern Slovakia, historically in the Zemplén region of the Kingdom of Hungary

== Surname ==
- Tusa (surname)

== Other uses ==
- "Tusa" (song), a 2019 song by Karol G and Nicki Minaj

== See also ==
- TUSAS, an acronym for Turkish Aerospace Industries (TAI)
