= Tusa (surname) =

Tusa is a surname, and may refer to:

- Arnold Tusa (born 1940), Canadian politician
- Emeric Tușa (born 1941), Romanian rower
- Frank Tusa (born 1947), American jazz double-bassist and composer
- John Tusa (born 1936), British journalist and arts administrator
- Rahma Tusa (born 1993), Ethiopian long-distance runner
- Sebastiano Tusa (1952–2019), Italian archaeologist and politician
- Vincenzo Tusa (1920–2009), Italian archaeologist
