= Antonino Salinas =

Italian numismatist, archaeologist and art historian

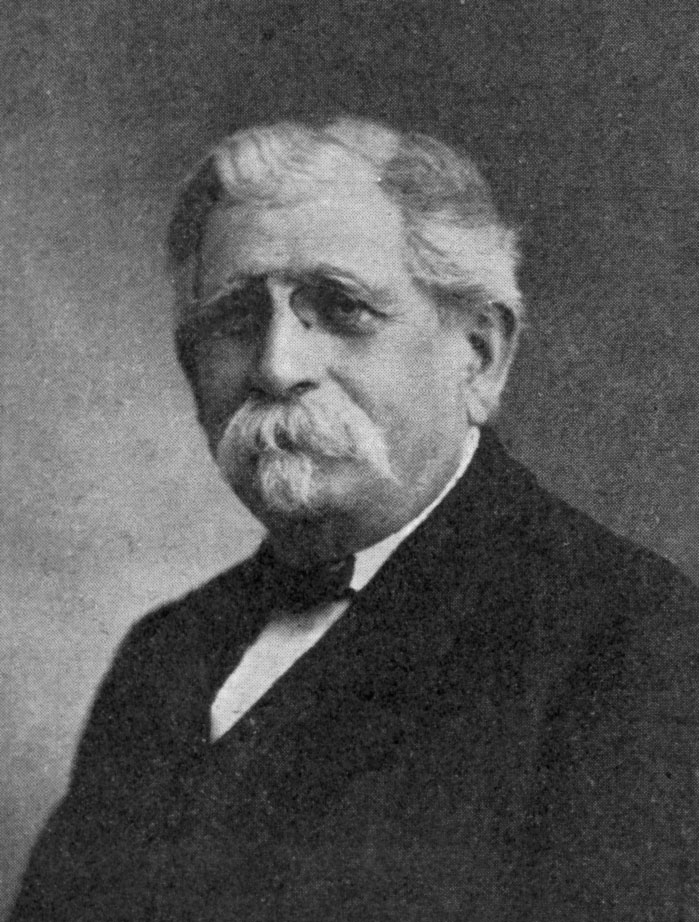
Portrait of Antonino Salinas

Antonino Salinas (19 November 1841 – 7 March 1914) was an Italian archaeologist and numismatist.

== Life ==
Born in Palermo and educated in strict scientific methods from a young age, he entered the Jurisprudence Faculty at the University of Palermo in 1856 but joined the Southern Army after Garibaldi landed at Marsala four years later. On 13 July 1860 Salinas was made a sottotenente in the artillery, fighting at Volturno and Capua before being demobbed in January 1861 and granted a bronze medal in 1862. He returned to work in Palermo's city archives, publishing his first works – these were on his main passion of numismatics.

In 1862, for a year, he went to the Humboldt University of Berlin to complete his education, taking courses in archaeology taught by Eduard Gerhard, cartography by Heinrich Kiepert and history by Theodor Mommsen. He then took long study trips to Vienna, Athens (where he took part in the Missione Italiana's first excavations at the Ceramico necropoli) and Paris before returning to Italy. There he was made extraordinary professor of archaeology at the University of Palermo in 1865, aged only 24, transmitting what he had learned in Berlin to his students. In 1867 he became ordinary professor of archaeology and later served a term as the university's rector of the University of Palermo (1903–1904). He also served two terms as president of Palermo's Facoltà di Lettere e Filosofia (1880–1882 and 1893–1894) as well as becoming city counsellor and assessor to the Istruzione del Comune di Palermo.

From 1873 to his death he served as director of Palermo's Museo Nazionale, which was later renamed after him. He took part in excavations at Mozia, Tindari, Selinunte and elsewhere on Sicily, finding four archaic metopes at Selinunte, which were moved to the Museo Nazionale. He was also made superintendent for the provinces of Palermo, Trapani, Girgenti and Messina, becoming particularly noted for saving and curating artworks after the 1908 Messina earthquake. He was one of the founders of the Italian Numismatic Institute and served as its president from 1912 until his death.

He was elected a national member of the Accademia dei Lincei in 1908. He left his private collection to the Museo Nazionale on his death in Rome in 1914, including several books and around 6000 coins – it held a biographical exhibition on him on the centenary of his death. He was buried in the Santa Maria di Gesù Cemetery in Palermo. 2017 saw the publication of a collection of his numismatic writings, edited by the numismatist Luca Lombardi.

The Antonino Salinas Regional Archeological Museum in Palermo is named in his honour.

== Works ==
- I monumenti sepolcrali scoperti presso la chiesa della Santa Trinità in Atene. Torino 1863.
- Le monete delle antiche città di Sicilia. Palermo, 1870.
- Suggelli siciliani del medioevo, Palermo, 1871
- Del Museo nazionale di Palermo e del suo avvenire. Palermo, 1874.
- Ricordi storici delle rivoluzioni siciliane del secolo XIX. Palermo, 1886.
- Le monete delle antiche città di Sicilia descritte e illustrate, Palermo, 1922
- Scritti scelti (edited by Vincenzo Tusa), II voll., Palermo, 1976–1977
- Scritti scelti di numismatica (edited by Giuseppe Ruotolo and Luca Lombardi), Biblionumis, Bari 2017, pp. 112, 5 tavv., cm 30 x 22.

== Bibliography ==
- (in Italian) Works by Antonio Salinas on openMLOL
- (in French) Works by Antonio Salinas on Persée
- Works by Antonio Salinas on Open Library
- (in Italian) Vincenzo Tusa, Antonio Salinas nella cultura palermitana, Palermo, 1978
- (in Italian) Francesca Spatafora e Lucina Gandolfo,Il Salinas ricorda Salinas 1914–2014, Palermo, 2014
- (in Italian) Fabrizio Vistoli, Una mostra, un catalogo, un’ipoteca sul futuro. Ancora su Antonino Salinas e il Museo archeologico di Palermo, in Atti e Memorie della Società Magna Grecia, s. V, I, 2016 [2017], pp. 183–224.
- *(in Italian) A. Salinas, L'Annunziata d'Antonello di Messina lasciata al Museo Nazionale di Palermo, Bollettino d'Arte, 2, 1907
