= Sebastiano Tusa =

Italian archaeologist and politician (1952–2019)

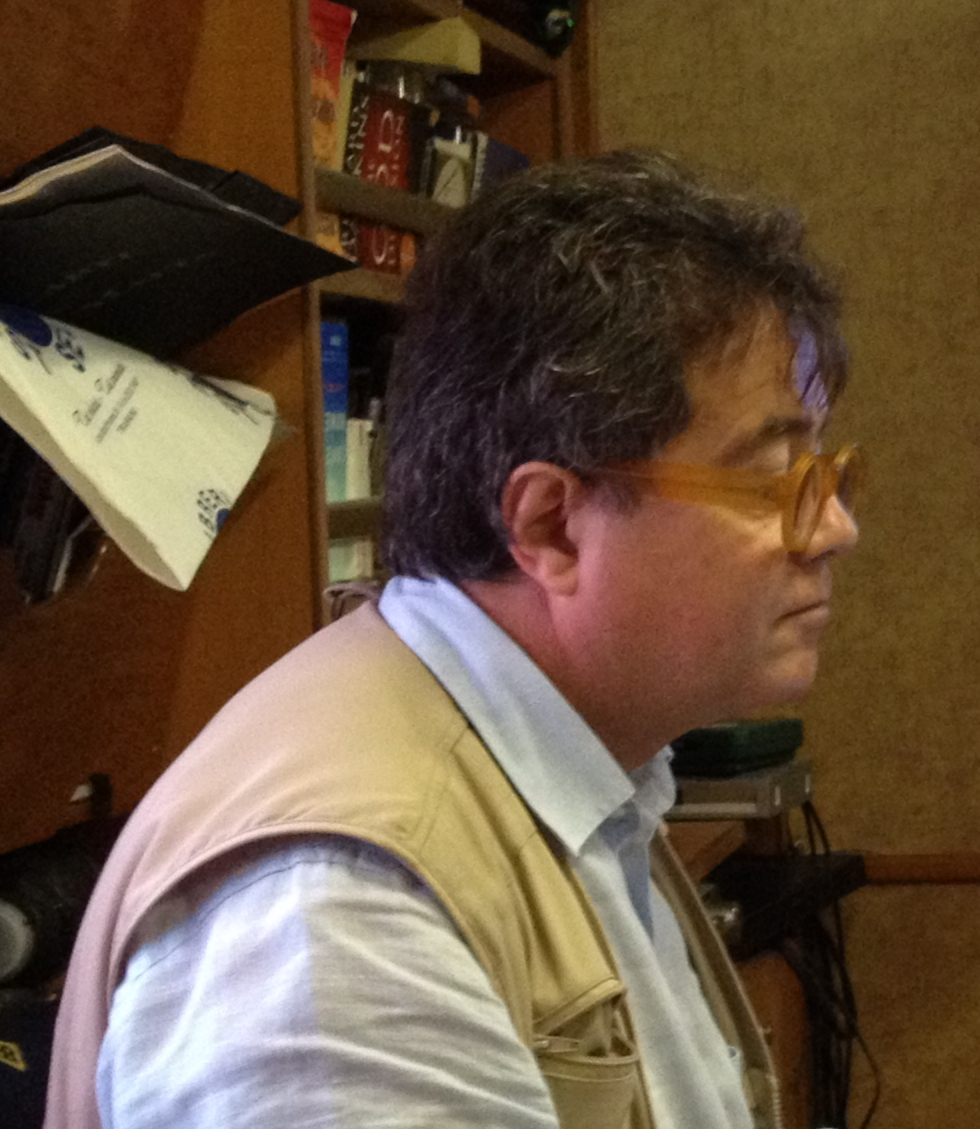

Councillor for Cultural Heritage for Sicily
- In office 11 April 2018 – 10 March 2019
- Preceded by: Vittorio Sgarbi

Personal details
- Born: 2 August 1952 Sicily, Italy
- Died: 10 March 2019 (aged 66) near Bishoftu, Ethiopia
- Spouse: Valeria Patrizia Li Vigni
- Education: Sapienza University of Rome
- Occupation: Archaeologist, professor, politician

Sebastiano Tusa (2 August 1952 – 10 March 2019) was an Italian archaeologist and politician who served as councilor for Cultural Heritage for the Sicilian Region of Italy from 11 April 2018 until his death on 10 March 2019. Tusa also served as a professor of paleontology at the Suor Orsola Benincasa University of Naples.

== Biography ==
Sebastiano was the son of archaeologist Vincenzo Tusa. He had a degree in literature with a specialization in Paleontology from Sapienza University of Rome. As the manager of the Sicilian Regional administration since 1993 he was responsible for the archaeological section of the Regional Center for Design and Restoration. In 2003, during excavations he conducted in Pantelleria three Roman imperial portraits were found.

Abandoning field research, Tusa dealt with the administration of cultural heritage in the roles of the Sicilian Region, leading the superintendency of Trapani. In 2004 he was appointed as the first Superintendent of the Sea by the Department of Cultural Heritage of the Sicilian Region. He organized archaeological missions in Italy, Pakistan, Iran and Iraq.

In 2005, he led the excavations at Motya, bringing to light, the submerged road that leads to the island, as well as structures identifiable as quays. In 2008 Tusa and Folco Quilici made a documentary film on the prehistory of the Mediterranean at Pantelleria. The excavations he promoted, and conducted in the field by Fabrizio Nicoletti and Maurizio Cattani, also confirmed the role of Pantelleria as a "crossroads for merchants" in ancient times.

In January 2010, he was named honorary member of the National Archaeologists Association. In 2012 he returned to head the Superintendence of the Sea of the Region. In March 2012 Tusa was a candidate for the Palermo city council in the list of FLI but lost the election. After leaving the Superintendency of the Sea, on 11 April 2018 he was appointed councilor for Cultural Heritage by the president of the Sicilian Region Nello Musumeci, replacing Vittorio Sgarbi.

== Academic work ==
From the 2000s until his death, Tusa was a professor of Palethnology at the University School of Archaeological Cultural Heritage based in Agrigento (1992/1994) and Marine Archeology during a three-year degree in Marine Biology, based in Trapani, both from the University of Palermo. He was also a professor of Paleontology at the Suor Orsola Benincasa University of Naples and a lecturer at the School of Arts and Humanities at the University of Bologna. In the academic year 2015-16 he was a contract professor at the Philipps University of Marburg in Germany.

== Death ==
Tusa was one of 157 people killed in the crash of Ethiopian Airlines Flight 302, on 10 March 2019. The plane was flying from Addis Ababa to Nairobi. He was heading to Malindi, where he had been invited to attend a conference organized by UNESCO. He was 66 years old at that time.

Tusa was survived by his wife, Valeria Patrizia Li Vigni, the director of the Palazzo Riso Museum of Contemporary Art in Palermo.

== Published works ==
- La preistoria nel territorio di Trapani, Marsilio, 1990.
- Mozia, Publisicula, 1990.
- Sicilia preistorica, Dario Flaccovio Editore, 1994. ISBN 88-7758-227-8.
- La Sicilia nella preistoria, Sellerio, 1999, ISBN 88-389-1440-0.
- Archeologia e storia nei mari di Sicilia, Magnus, 2010. ISBN 978-88-7057-252-0.
- Selinunte, L'Erma di Bretschneider, 2011. ISBN 978-88-8265-592-1.
- Sicilia archeologica, Edizioni di Storia e Studi Sociali, 2015. ISBN 978-88-99168-05-6
- Primo Mediterraneo. Meditazioni sul mare più antico della storia, Edizioni di Storia e Studi Sociali, 2016
- I popoli del Grande Verde : il Mediterraneo al tempo dei faraoni (in Italian). Ragusa: Edizioni Storia e Studi Sociali. 2018. ISBN 9788899168308. OCLC 1038750254.
