= Vincenzo Tusa =

Italian archaeologist (1920–2009)

Vincenzo Tusa (12 July 1920 – 5 March 2009) was an Italian archeologist.

== Biography ==
Vincenzo Tusa initially studied in Mistretta, and later obtained his degree in literature in Catania in 1944, going on to become an assistant in Archeology. In 1947 he was hired by the Superintendency of Antiquities in Bologna and two years later he was transferred to Palermo. In 1963 he assumed the position of Superintendent for the BBCC of western Sicily.

During his time at the Superintendency, Tusa was responsible for promoting several excavations in the archaeological sites of Soluntum, Segesta, Selinunte, Motya, Marsala.

In the 1960's Tusa was the promoter of the Sicilia Archeologica magazine, as well as professor of Punic Antiquities at the Faculty of Letters of the University of Palermo until 1991.

Tusa was also a member of the Accademia dei Lincei for the Archeology category within the Moral Sciences class. His son, Sebastiano Tusa, also an archaeologist, held the position of head of the Superintendency for the Sea of the Sicilian Region.

Additionally, Tusa's name appears on the list of members of the Masonic lodge P2.

== Acknowledgments ==
In Tusa the Sicilian Region has dedicated the Cave Archeology Area of Cusa Vincenzo Tusa.

== Works ==
- L'urbanistica di Solunto, 1970
- Anastylosis ad Agrigento Tempio di Eracle e Selinunte Tempio C, 1975
- La scultura in pietra di Selinunte, 1984
- La preistoria in Sicilia, 1987
- Selinunte nella mia vita, 1990
- Segesta, 1991
- Siciliani illustri: Antonino Salinas, 1995
- Sarcofagi romani in Sicilia, 1995
- Il parco archeologico di Selinunte, 2011
