= Mohavvaleh-ye Abu Hadij =

Mohavvaleh-ye Abu Hadij محوله ابوحديج
- Village
- Location within Iran
- Coordinates: 30°29′02″N 48°08′34″E
- Country: Iran
- Province: Khuzestan
- County: Khorramshahr
- Bakhsh: Central
- Rural District: Howmeh-ye Gharbi

Population (2006)
  - Total: 144
- Time zone: UTC+3:30 (IRST)
  - Summer (DST): UTC+4:30 (IRDT)

Mohavvaleh-ye Abu Hadij (Persian: محوله ابوحديج, also Romanized as Moḥavvaleh-ye Abū Ḩadīj) is a village in Howmeh-ye Gharbi Rural District, in the Central District of Khorramshahr County, Khuzestan Province, Iran. At the 2006 census, its population was 144, in 31 families.
