= Taleb-e Asfur =

Taleb-e Asfur طالب عصفور
- Village
- Location within Iran
- Coordinates: 30°19′26″N 48°13′11″E
- Country: Iran
- Province: Khuzestan
- County: Khorramshahr
- Bakhsh: Minu
- Rural District: Jazireh-ye Minu

Population (2006)
  - Total: 47
- Time zone: UTC+3:30 (IRST)
  - Summer (DST): UTC+4:30 (IRDT)

Taleb-e Asfur (Persian: طالب عصفور, also Romanized as Ţāleb-e ʿAṣfūr; also known as Ţāleb-e Aş‘ūr) is a village in Jazireh-ye Minu Rural District, Minu District, Khorramshahr County, Khuzestan Province, Iran. At the 2006 census, its population was 47, in 9 families.
