= Naimiyeh =

Naimiyeh (Arabic: النعيمية, romanized: Naʿimiya; Persian: نعميه or نعيميه) may refer to the following places in the Middle East:

== Iran ==
- Naimiyeh, Khuzestan
- Naimiyeh-ye Seyyed Naser, Khuzestan Province

== Syria ==
- Naimiyeh, Syria, a village in central Syria's desert fringe
