= Roveys Tameh =

Roveys Tameh رويس طعمه
- Village
- Location within Iran
- Coordinates: 30°25′00″N 48°12′00″E
- Country: Iran
- Province: Khuzestan
- County: Khorramshahr
- Bakhsh: Minu
- Rural District: Jazireh-ye Minu

Population (2006)
  - Total: 148
- Time zone: UTC+3:30 (IRST)
  - Summer (DST): UTC+4:30 (IRDT)

Roveys Tameh (Persian: رويس طعمه, also Romanized as Roveys Ţaʿmeh; also known as Barzīn, Rovays, Roveys, and Rūveys) is a village in Jazireh-ye Minu Rural District, Minu District, Khorramshahr County, Khuzestan Province, Iran. At the 2006 census, its population was 148, in 36 families.
