= Ghanemiyeh-ye Isa =

Ghanemiyeh-ye Isa غانميه عيسي
- Village
- Location within Iran
- Coordinates: 30°20′33″N 48°14′02″E
- Country: Iran
- Province: Khuzestan
- County: Khorramshahr
- Bakhsh: Minu
- Rural District: Jazireh-ye Minu

Population (2006)
  - Total: 221
- Time zone: UTC+3:30 (IRST)
  - Summer (DST): UTC+4:30 (IRDT)

Ghanemiyeh-ye Isa (Persian: غانميه عيسي, also Romanized as Ghānemīyeh-ye ‘Īsá; also known as Ghānemīyeh and Raddeh-ye Ghānemīyeh) is a village in Jazireh-ye Minu Rural District, Minu District, Khorramshahr County, Khuzestan Province, Iran. At the 2006 census, its population was 221, in 45 families.
