= Shalheh =

Shalheh شلحه
- Village
- Location within Iran
- Coordinates: 30°26′00″N 48°15′00″E
- Country: Iran
- Province: Khuzestan
- County: Khorramshahr
- Bakhsh: Central
- Rural District: Howmeh-ye Sharqi

Population (2006)
  - Total: 297
- Time zone: UTC+3:30 (IRST)
  - Summer (DST): UTC+4:30 (IRDT)

Shalheh (Persian: شلحه, also Romanized as Shalḩeh) is a village in Howmeh-ye Sharqi Rural District, in the Central District of Khorramshahr County, Khuzestan Province, Iran. At the 2006 census, its population was 297, in 51 families.
