= Qosbeh =

Qosbeh (Persian: قصبه) may refer to:

- Qosbeh-ye Maniat
- Qosbeh-ye Nassar

== See also ==
- Qasabeh (disambiguation)
