= Maslavi =

Maslavi مصلاوي
- Village
- Location within Iran
- Coordinates: 30°28′08″N 48°08′21″E
- Country: Iran
- Province: Khuzestan
- County: Khorramshahr
- Bakhsh: Central
- Rural District: Howmeh-ye Gharbi

Population (2006)
  - Total: 823
- Time zone: UTC+3:30 (IRST)
  - Summer (DST): UTC+4:30 (IRDT)

Maslavi (Persian: مصلاوي, also Romanized as Maşlāvī and Maslāvī) is a village in Howmeh-ye Gharbi Rural District, in the Central District of Khorramshahr County, Khuzestan Province, Iran. At the 2006 census, its population was 823, in 185 families.
