= Omm ol Khareyn =

Omm ol Khareyn ام الخرين
- Village
- Location within Iran
- Coordinates: 30°45′03″N 48°24′56″E
- Country: Iran
- Province: Khuzestan
- County: Khorramshahr
- Bakhsh: Central
- Rural District: Gharb-e Karun

Population (2006)
  - Total: 399
- Time zone: UTC+3:30 (IRST)
  - Summer (DST): UTC+4:30 (IRDT)

Omm ol Khareyn (Persian: ام الخرين; also known as Hovīsār, Omm-ol Hazīn, and Omm ol Khazeyn) is a village in Gharb-e Karun Rural District, in the Central District of Khorramshahr County, Khuzestan Province, Iran. At the 2006 census, its population was 399, in 71 families.
