= Soveychti =

Soveychti or Soveycheti (Persian: سوي چيتي) may refer to:

- Soveychti 1
- Soveychti 2
- Soveychti 3
