= Ahmad-e Omran =

Ahmad-e Omran احمدعمران
- Village
- Location within Iran
- Coordinates: 30°22′20″N 48°12′19″E
- Country: Iran
- Province: Khuzestan
- County: Khorramshahr
- Bakhsh: Minu
- Rural District: Jazireh-ye Minu

Population (2006)
  - Total: 494
- Time zone: UTC+3:30 (IRST)
  - Summer (DST): UTC+4:30 (IRDT)

Ahmad-e Omran (Persian: احمدعمران, also Romanized as Aḩmad-e ‘Omrān; also known as Maʿbūdī) is a village in Jazireh-ye Minu Rural District, Minu District, Khorramshahr County, Khuzestan Province, Iran. At the 2006 census, its population was 494, in 106 families.
