= Shalheh, Minu =

Shalheh شلحه
- Village
- Location within Iran
- Coordinates: 30°16′14″N 48°21′03″E
- Country: Iran
- Province: Khuzestan
- County: Khorramshahr
- Bakhsh: Minu
- Rural District: Jazireh-ye Minu

Population (2006)
  - Total: 399
- Time zone: UTC+3:30 (IRST)
  - Summer (DST): UTC+4:30 (IRDT)

Shalheh (Persian: شلحه, also Romanized as Shalḥeh; also known as Shalīḥeh) is a village in Jazireh-ye Minu Rural District, Minu District, Khorramshahr County, Khuzestan Province, Iran. At the 2006 census, its population was 399, in 80 families.
