= Hanishiyeh =

Hanishiyeh حنيشيه
- Village
- Location within Iran
- Coordinates: 30°27′59″N 48°14′42″E
- Country: Iran
- Province: Khuzestan
- County: Khorramshahr
- Bakhsh: Central
- Rural District: Howmeh-ye Sharqi

Population (2006)
  - Total: 108
- Time zone: UTC+3:30 (IRST)
  - Summer (DST): UTC+4:30 (IRDT)

Hanishiyeh (Persian: حنيشيه, also Romanized as Hanīshīyeh) is a village in Howmeh-ye Sharqi Rural District, in the Central District of Khorramshahr County, Khuzestan Province, Iran. At the 2006 census, its population was 108, in 25 families.
