= Deym Ebn-e Najm =

Deym Ebn-e Najm ديم ابن نجم
- Village
- Location within Iran
- Coordinates: 30°56′48″N 48°20′51″E
- Country: Iran
- Province: Khuzestan
- County: Khorramshahr
- Bakhsh: Central
- Rural District: Gharb-e Karun

Population (2006)
  - Total: 738
- Time zone: UTC+3:30 (IRST)
  - Summer (DST): UTC+4:30 (IRDT)

Deym Ebn-e Najm (Persian: ديم ابن نجم, also Romanized as Deym Ebn-e Najm and Dīm Ebn-e Najm; also known as Deym Ben Najm and Kāz̧emī-ye Seh) is a village in Gharb-e Karun Rural District, in the Central District of Khorramshahr County, Khuzestan Province, Iran. At the 2006 census, its population was 738, in 136 families.
