= Omm ol Ejaj =

Omm ol Ejaj ام العجاج
- Village
- Location within Iran
- Coordinates: 30°20′39″N 48°13′06″E
- Country: Iran
- Province: Khuzestan
- County: Khorramshahr
- Bakhsh: Minu
- Rural District: Jazireh-ye Minu

Population (2006)
  - Total: 264
- Time zone: UTC+3:30 (IRST)
  - Summer (DST): UTC+4:30 (IRDT)

Omm ol Ejaj (Persian: ام العجاج, also romanized as Omm ol ‘Ejāj) is a village in Jazireh-ye Minu Rural District, Minu District, Khorramshahr County, Khuzestan Province, Iran. At the 2006 census, its population was 264, in 56 families.
