= Sanad Rashed, Iran =

Sanad Rashed سندراشد
- Village
- Location within Iran
- Coordinates: 30°21′14″N 48°12′14″E
- Country: Iran
- Province: Khuzestan
- County: Khorramshahr
- Bakhsh: Minu
- Rural District: Jazireh-ye Minu

Population (2006)
  - Total: 173
- Time zone: UTC+3:30 (IRST)
  - Summer (DST): UTC+4:30 (IRDT)

Sanad Rashed (Persian: سندراشد, also Romanized as Sanad Rāshed; also known as Seyyed Rāshed) is a village in Jazireh-ye Minu Rural District, Minu District, Khorramshahr County, Khuzestan Province, Iran. At the 2006 census, its population was 173, in 34 families.
