= Rahmani, Iran =

Rahmani (Persian: رحماني) may refer to:

- Rahmani, Khuzestan
- Rahmani-ye Jadid, Khuzestan Province
- Rahmani, South Khorasan
