= Badriyeh =

Badriyeh بدريه
- Village
- Location within Iran
- Coordinates: 30°27′45″N 48°14′43″E
- Country: Iran
- Province: Khuzestan
- County: Khorramshahr
- Bakhsh: Central
- Rural District: Howmeh-ye Sharqi

Population (2006)
  - Total: 236
- Time zone: UTC+3:30 (IRST)
  - Summer (DST): UTC+4:30 (IRDT)

Badriyeh (Persian: بدريه, also Romanized as Badrīyeh) is a village in Howmeh-ye Sharqi Rural District, in the Central District of Khorramshahr County, Khuzestan Province, Iran. At the 2006 census, its population was 236, in 41 families.
