= Qasabeh (disambiguation) =

Qasabeh is an alternate name of Fereydunkenar, a city in Mazandaran Province, Iran.

Qasabeh (Persian: قصبه) may also refer to:

- Qasabeh, Kerman
- Qasabeh, Abadan, Khuzestan Province
- Qasabeh, Khorramshahr, Khuzestan Province
- Qasabeh, Shadegan, Khuzestan Province
- Qasabeh, South Khorasan
- Qasabeh-ye Firuz Kuh
- Qasabeh-ye Rud
- Qasabeh-ye Gharbi Rural District, in Razavi Khorasan Province
- Qasabeh-ye Sharqi Rural District, in Razavi Khorasan Province
