= Moammareh =

Moammareh or Moammereh (Persian: معمره) may refer to:

- Moammareh, Khorramshahr
- Moammereh, Minu

== See also ==
- Moamereh
