= Ramsan, Iran =

Ramsan رمسان
- Village
- Country: Iran
- Province: Khuzestan
- County: Khorramshahr
- Bakhsh: Central
- Rural District: Howmeh-ye Sharqi

Population (2006)
  - Total: 199
- Time zone: UTC+3:30 (IRST)
  - Summer (DST): UTC+4:30 (IRDT)

Ramsan (Persian: رمسان, also Romanized as Ramsān) is a village in Howmeh-ye Sharqi Rural District, in the Central District of Khorramshahr County, Khuzestan Province, Iran. At the 2006 census, its population was 199, in 46 families.
