= Constitution of Carthage =

Political regime in Carthage

Bust of the philosopher Aristotle, an essential source of knowledge and insight into the institutions of Punic Carthage, Roman copy after an original by Lysippus, Museo Altemps, Rome.

The constitution of Carthage is the political regime of the city in Punic times.

Carthage's political system has been the subject of much debate, as Aristotle's Politics discusses it at length, alongside the institutions of Sparta and Crete. This text, the only example of its time to refer in extenso to non-Greek political institutions, has given rise to much controversy among historians, which has not subsided in the present day.

Carthage's political organization was praised by many ancient authors, who highlighted its "reputation for excellence". Although few details are known about the government of the great city, we do have Aristotle's invaluable text: he depicts it as a model of a "mixed" constitution, balanced and displaying the best characteristics of the various types of political regimes, i.e. blending elements of the monarchical (kings or suffetes), aristocratic (Senate) and democratic (assembly of the people) systems.

The sources are very limited and mostly biased, as they are sometimes taken from Roman or Greek authors, making it difficult to conclude the debate. In addition, the cultural context and the terminology used do not conform to the Eastern political context. Aristotle's text seems to describe static political institutions, taking no account of developments linked to conflicts in Carthage's history, including the Sicilian Wars, which predate the text; nor is there any information on changes linked to the period of the Punic Wars and the Mercenary War, among others. Aristotle's text has therefore fuelled a lively debate, with some historians, including Stéphane Gsell, regarding it as a late description. Researchers now prefer to focus on the evolution of institutions over history.

Despite the shortcomings of the information available on Carthage, the data is much more extensive than for the other Carthaginian cities.

== Brief history of the question ==
For a long time, the question of Carthage's constitution revolved around the debate over kingship in Carthage. Classical authors considered that a monarchy had existed in the city, and even in the early 20th century, Karl Julius Beloch fiercely defended the thesis of the existence of Carthaginian kings. Indeed, the city's suffetes are referred to as "kings" in classical sources. These sources use terminology that is specific to their political context and could only give an approximate view of Punic institutions.

One of the main arguments in favor of kings was the proven existence of Phoenician monarchies that combined political and religious power, as in the 5th century BC Sarcophagus of Eshmunazar II. There has also been much debate as to whether the Barcids established a kingdom in Spain when they conquered the Iberian populations. While Hédi Dridi acknowledges the principle of succession in this family, he considers that there is no evidence of kingship to date, not even the themes used on Hispanic coinage.

As early as the beginning of the 20th century, Stéphane Gsell expressed serious doubts on the matter, and referred to the "synonymy of the terms basileus, rex and sufes". The issue was taken up by Gilbert Charles-Picard, who took it a step further by seeking to develop an internal history of Carthage based on the presumed reigns of kings identified for the 5th century BC. However, the same author largely questioned his assertions at the end of his life. Nonetheless, Carthage did experience coup attempts, such as that of Malchus in the fifth century BC and of Bomilcar at the time of Agathocles of Syracuse's attack (5th century BC). Most specialists today agree that the Carthaginian political system cannot be assimilated into a monarchy.

== Institutional evolution ==
Zones of influence in the western Mediterranean in 279 BC, the peak of Carthage's influence.

Carthage's political institutions could not have remained static throughout the city's existence, and it is hard to imagine that the ups and downs of history, made up of expansions and refluxes, were without consequence. The choice of presenting Carthage's institutions in Aristotle's work is perhaps linked to Aristotle's desire to present archaisms and, at the very least, provides a picture of the city's institutions in the second half of the 4th century BC.

The constitution is seen as mixed, with a strong executive power, a deliberative assembly, and a high council, marking an oligarchic and aristocratic aspect, and an assembly of the people endowed with an important arbitration role. François Decret believes that the city's first institutions were modeled on those of the mother city, Tyre. The Punic city extended its power into the western Mediterranean, particularly after the Assyrian conquest of Tyre in the 6th century BC, which freed it from the obligation to pay tribute to the Africans.

In the middle of the 2nd century BC, Malchus, a general who had fought in Sicily and Sardinia, is said to have seized power in Carthage and had ten senators executed before being put to death for tyranny. According to proponents of the Carthage kingship thesis, after the monarchic phase, a major institutional evolution followed the fall of Bomilcar in 308, and it was these new institutions that were the subject of Aristotle's description, culminating in an aristocratic republic. The 4th century BC in Carthage was a century of major upheaval, and the Hannonid family rose to prominence. Aristotle points out that Hannon wished to become a monarch and thus qualifies his statement on the supposed institutional stability of the city.

According to François Decret, the people's assembly acquired greater power from the middle of the 2nd century BC, especially around 237 after the First Punic War, giving every citizen more influence in political life, with the process accelerating after the Battle of Zama. According to a text by Polybius, the result was that the voice of the people prevailed in deliberations. Titus Livius also mentions tensions in 196 between Hannibal and a judge in charge of financial functions, which led to a change in the law by the people's assembly, considering the judicial function to be annual and non-renewable. This affair was a sign of demagoguery and of the struggle between Hannibal and the Council of Elders, which led to his exile.

== Question of monarchial rule ==
=== "Kings" of Carthage ===
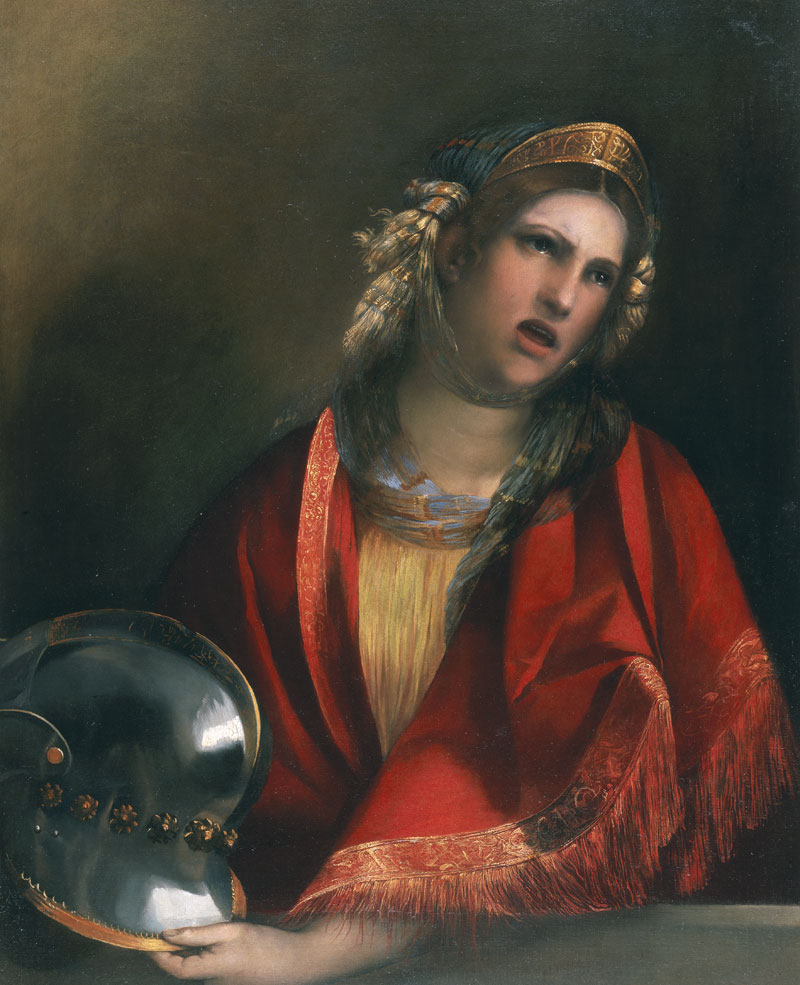
Didone by Dosso Dossi, Tyrian princess and legendary founder of Carthage.

The Phoenician-Punic world was not unaware of monarchy: indeed, Phoenician cities had kings very early on: kings were known in Byblos, Sidon, and Tyre. However, these kings did not wield absolute power: the hereditary Phoenician king was more the first among citizens than an absolute king. He was subject to pressure from his entourage (advisors), the wealthiest citizens (Council), and the people (Assemblies). In the metropolises, kings were in place, but nothing was certain about the situation in the colonies. In Cyprus, the presence of a king was assured, but in Carthage, the problem was posed. The legend of the founding of the city by Elissa-Didon, considered to have come from the royal family of Tyre, does not prove the introduction of a monarchical regime. Aristotle's text refers to "kings" (basileis), but since this dual kingship is not a proven Phoenician feature, it is all the more suspect. In contrast, the two kings, or archagetai under the Spartan monarchy is well-documented.

The theory of the Carthaginian kingship was bitterly defended and developed by Gilbert Charles-Picard for the 2nd and 5th centuries BC, following in the footsteps of Karl Julius Beloch. It was taken up by François Decret. Picard demonstrates an evolution in Carthage's institutions: a monarchy was established from the city's foundation, with a Magonid dynasty reigning, according to him, between 550 and 370, followed by the Hannonids until 308. After this date, the monarchy would only have been hereditary. However, this thesis is rejected by most historians, including Maurice Sznycer, who believes that the Semitic suffetate is the only real institution behind the terms used by Greco-Roman sources. Serge Lancel evokes a provisional kingship for the early history of Carthage, a military command with full powers entrusted for a given and possibly renewable period by an authority not cited in the sources.

Some historiography has also assumed monarchical ambitions, on the Hellenistic model, for the Barcids in Spain, a hypothesis also dismissed by Maurice Sznycer.

=== Suffetes ===
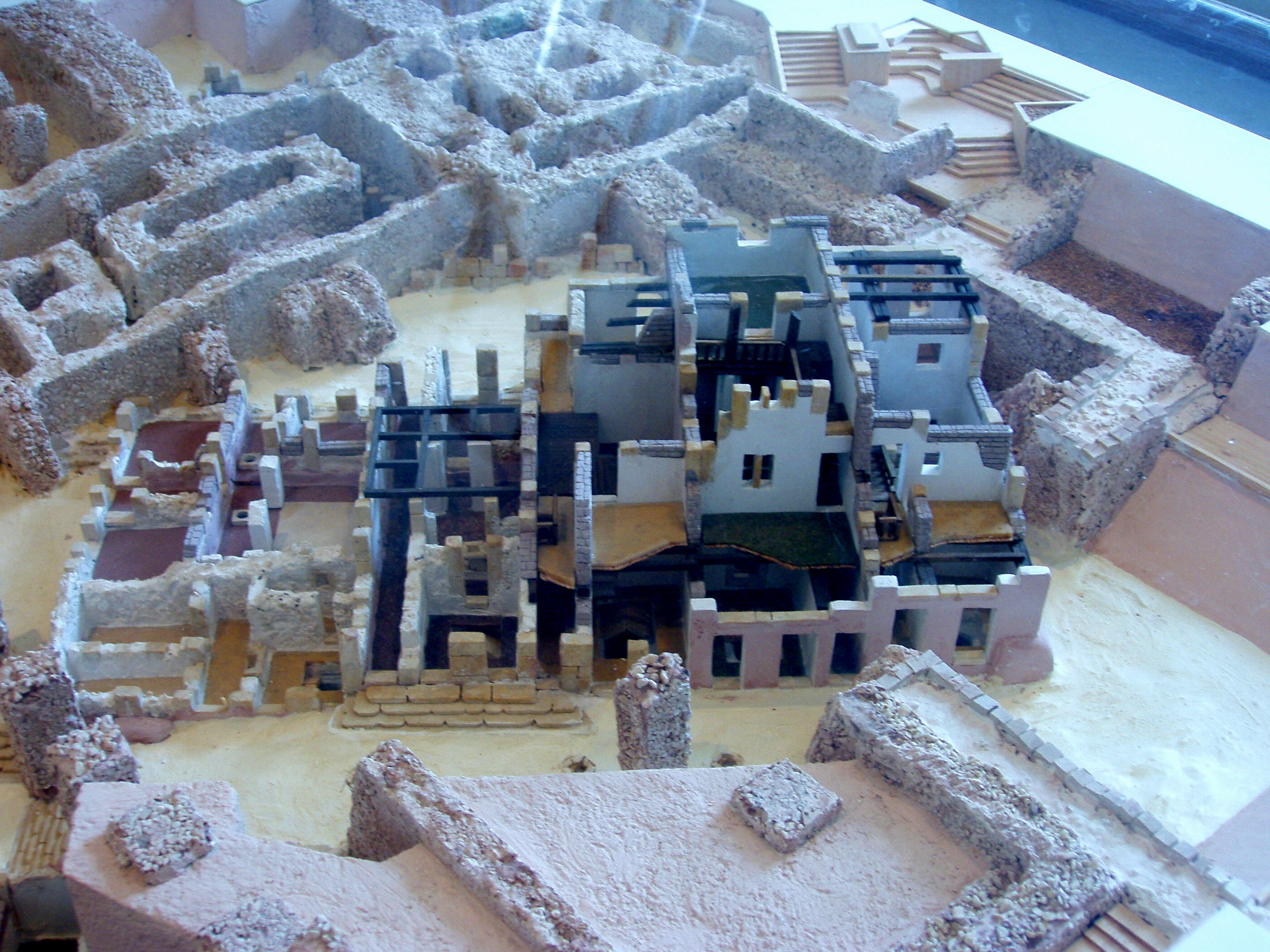
Model of the Punic quarter on the southern flank of Byrsa, supposedly the work of Hannibal Barca's suffetate in 197-196, Carthage National Museum.

The study of Carthage's kingship has led to the hypothesis that those called "kings" were in fact "suffetes". This hypothesis is more in line with Eastern traditions and those of Tyre: suffetes or SPT (shouphet meaning "judges") are, as in Israel, chiefs and rulers. While they were responsible for dispensing justice and managing civil administration, their office was not hereditary. The government was to be comparable to that of Rome, with a Senate and two suffetes elected annually, but called "kings" by the Romans and Greeks due to their inability to find a suitable term in their culture to convey the Punic reality. As Carthage's supreme magistrates, the two suffetes are implicitly mentioned by Cornelius Nepos: "In the same way that Rome gave itself consuls, Carthage created two kings each year with annual powers".

The suffetate is attested at the end of the 4th century BC and in the 2nd century BC, but in Tyre as early as the 5th century BC. It is thought that these suffetes exercised judicial power, in particular for private and executive law, but not military power – reserved for chiefs elected separately each year by the people's assembly and recruited from the city's great families – nor religious power. They would have had the political power to convene assemblies and preside over their debates.

Hannibal Barca is a case in point: according to Titus Livius, he was elected suffet after the defeat at Zama in 196. However, Hamilcar, defeated at Himera, was appointed basileus on account of his military valor.

In all likelihood, the suffetes' power was limited to the civil administration of public affairs. Chosen like all the city's magistrates based on their wealth and competence, they were not otherwise remunerated. M'hamed Hassine Fantar mentions a wide range of civil, religious, and military skills. According to him, they also convened and presided over assemblies.

Two eponymous annual suffetes existed from the 5th century BC onwards. Based on an inscription in the Corpus Inscriptionum Semiticarum, some authors, including Maria Giulia Amadasi Guzzo, have proposed that the suffetate was established in the last third of the century. As was the case in Rome, lists drawn up on durable materials must have existed, but they have not come down to us. The institution continued to exist in Roman times, with municipal magistrates, until the 1st century, both for cities in North Africa and Sardinia.

== Oligarchic elements: Council of Elders and Hundred and Four ==
Carthage had an assembly referred to by Polybius as the "Great Council", a plenary assembly and a restricted assembly, the "Council of Elders". Members of the Grand Council were members of the city's leading families.

=== Council of Elders ===
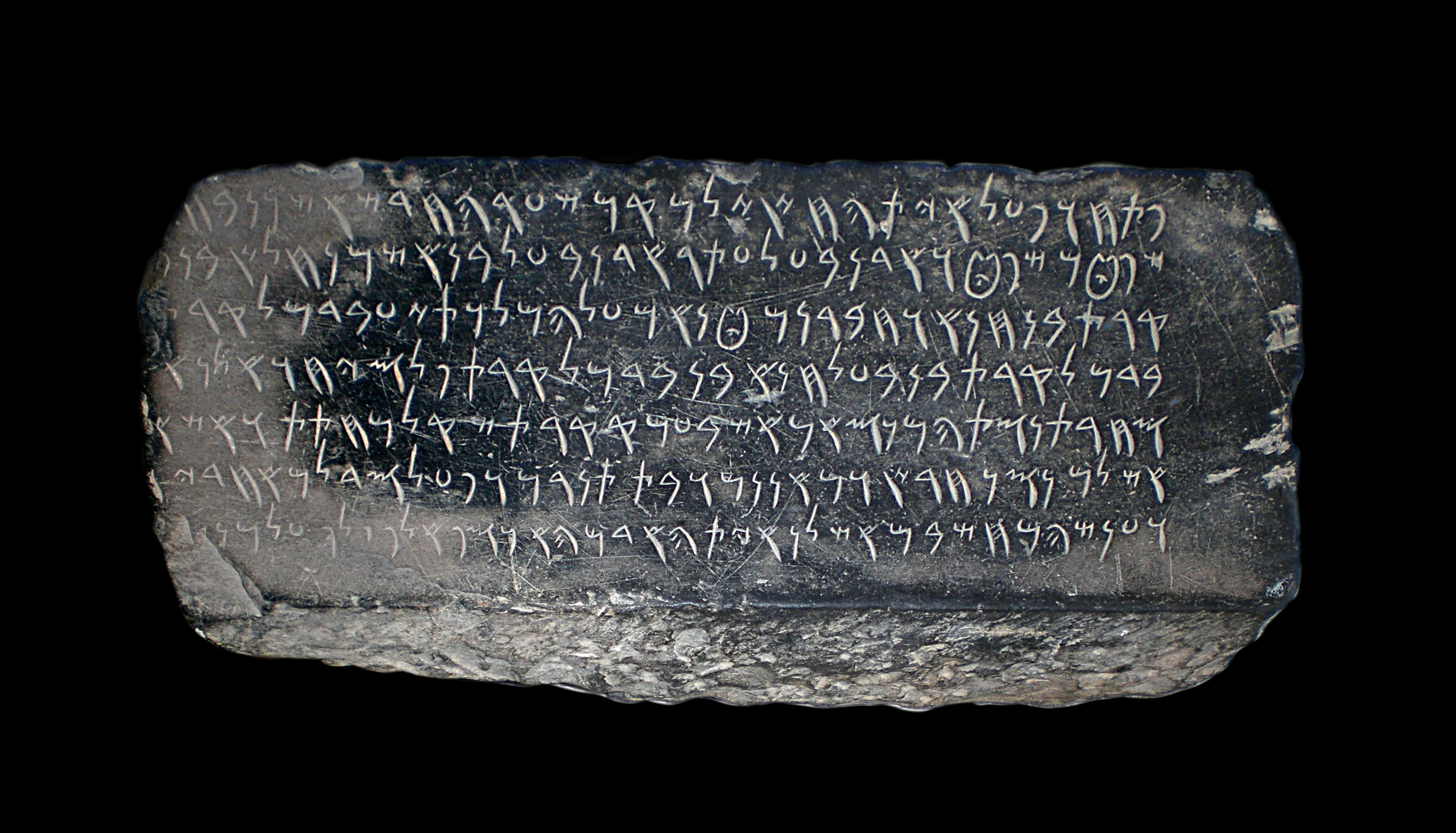
Carthage Administration Inscription in the Carthage National Museum, found outside its archaeological context and therefore difficult to interpret, but referring to magistrates (4th–2nd centuries BC).

The suffetes were assisted by a "Council of Elders", or gerousia, which was found in other cities, particularly Sparta: the texts refer to the "Elders of Carthage", according to a customary Semitic expression, as in Leptis Magna. Even in Roman times, the "Great Ones of Leptis" are mentioned.

According to Justin, this Council was already present in the 2nd century BC and has been likened to the Roman Senate, its members being referred to in various sources as gerontes or seniores. Meetings were held not far from the agora, the city's main square.

It may well have existed in the Punic city from its very origins. This body, probably made up of members of influential families, probably numbered several hundred members, although their exact number remains unknown. At the time of the Third Punic War, Polybius mentions 300 hostages from the families of Carthage's senators. How the office was passed on from one aristocratic family to another remains unknown. Likewise, this assembly probably met in a building close to the city's agora, or even in some cases in the temple of Eshmoun on the hill of Byrsa.

He was responsible for all city affairs: political and administrative matters, war and peace, foreign policy, the army (including the recruitment of mercenaries and the punishment of defeated generals), finance, etc. He was also called upon to make decisions relating to the private lives of individuals, forbidding magistrates to drink alcohol or prohibiting the use of Greek in 368.

The generals, appointed according to their skills, were accountable for their actions to this assembly, which had the final say and could impose heavy penalties. In 308, Bomilcar was sentenced to crucifixion for having attempted to seize power during the expedition of Agathocles of Syracuse.

=== Council of the Hundred and Four ===
In addition, Aristotle is the only person to mention a restricted council, the "Hundred and Four" or the "Hundred", and the "pentarchies". However, little is known about these institutions. The Hundred and Four are said to have been set up in 396 as a tribunal for political affairs.

The first, a kind of "High Court", was given a judicial and police role, based on a text by Justin; the latter refers to a tribunal with special judicial powers, made up of one hundred judges chosen from among the senators, on the occasion of a passage of generals before this jurisdiction after a war. It has been assumed that this body is an emanation of the Senate, a restricted council, whose members are chosen, according to Aristotle, by the pentarchies (a body of five magistrates recruited "by co-optation") "according to merit". Their role would have been to prepare decisions and agendas. They would have been irremovable until the political upheavals decided by Hannibal Barca during his activity as suffet in 197-196.

=== Other institutions ===
==== Pentarchies ====
Aristotle is the only person to mention the "pentarchies", which were recruited by co-optation. Their competencies are important and numerous, but unspecified, apart from the choice of a supreme magistrate to head the "Hundred". According to M'hamed Hassine Fantar, this attachment to the principle of collegiality is linked to the "profoundly democratic" feelings of the Carthaginians, with tyrannical temptations being brutally repressed. Collegiality was the only way to limit the risks associated with personal ambitions.

==== Commissions ====
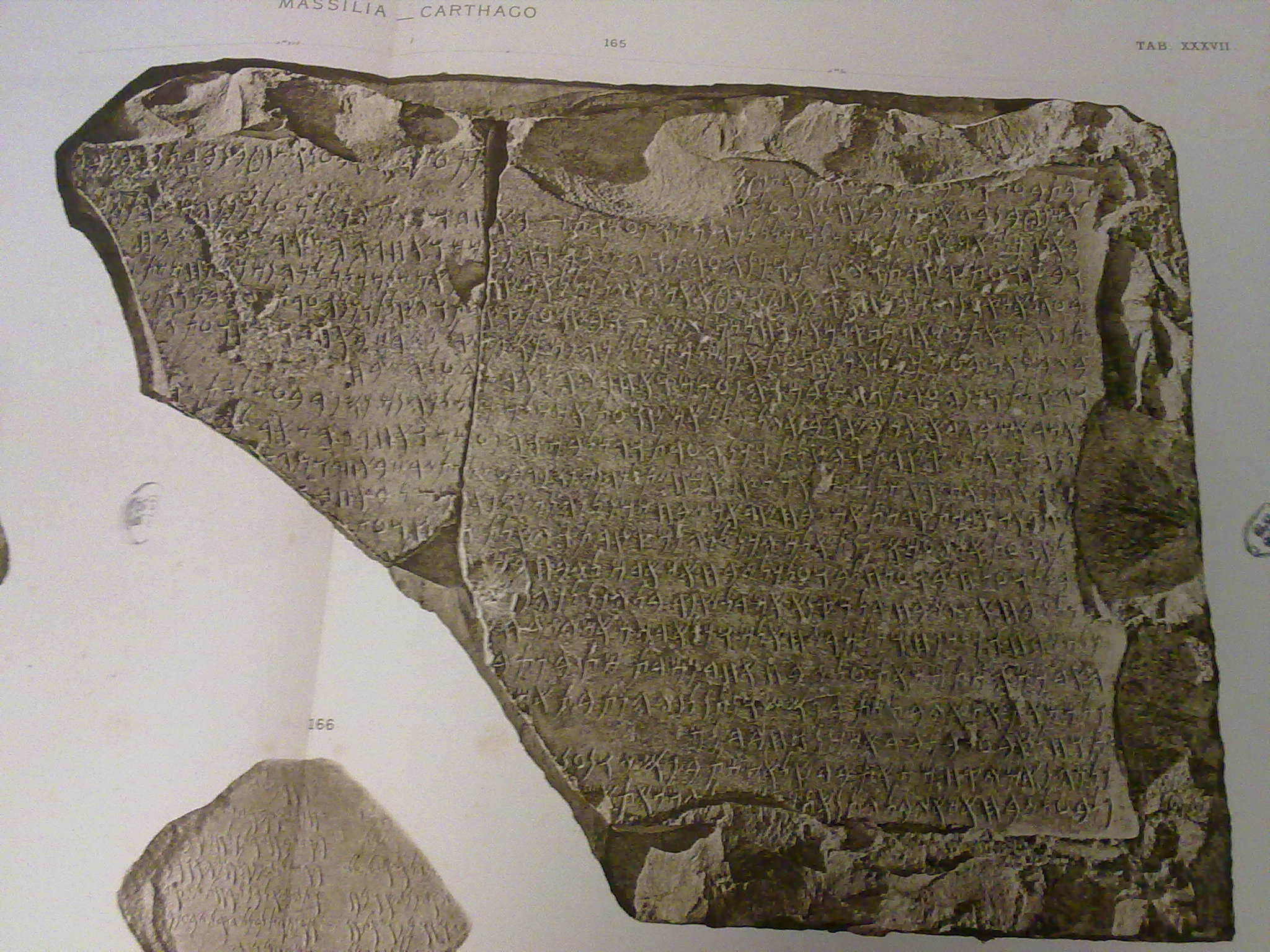
The Marseilles Tariff, a plate from Corpus Inscriptionum Semiticarum.

Polybius also mentions a thirty-member commission with diplomatic aims in 203. Epigraphy, for its part, confirms the existence of various specialized commissions, particularly religious, in the "sacrificial tariffs". The Marseilles tariff mentions "thirty men in charge of taxes" with broad financial powers. There were also "ten men in charge of sanctuaries". James Germain Février hypothesized a relationship between commissions and "pentarchies", the former being the union of six pentarchies, the latter the union of two.

==== Administration ====
The primary sources also mention members of the Punic administration, including rabs whose functions are poorly identified, but who must have had a hierarchical role. In addition, accountants and inspectors are listed, as well as officials with financial functions similar to the Roman quaestors. Neo-Punic epigraphic sources from Leptis Magna mention "market inspectors". There were also secretaries and scribes.

== Democratic elements: People's Assembly ==
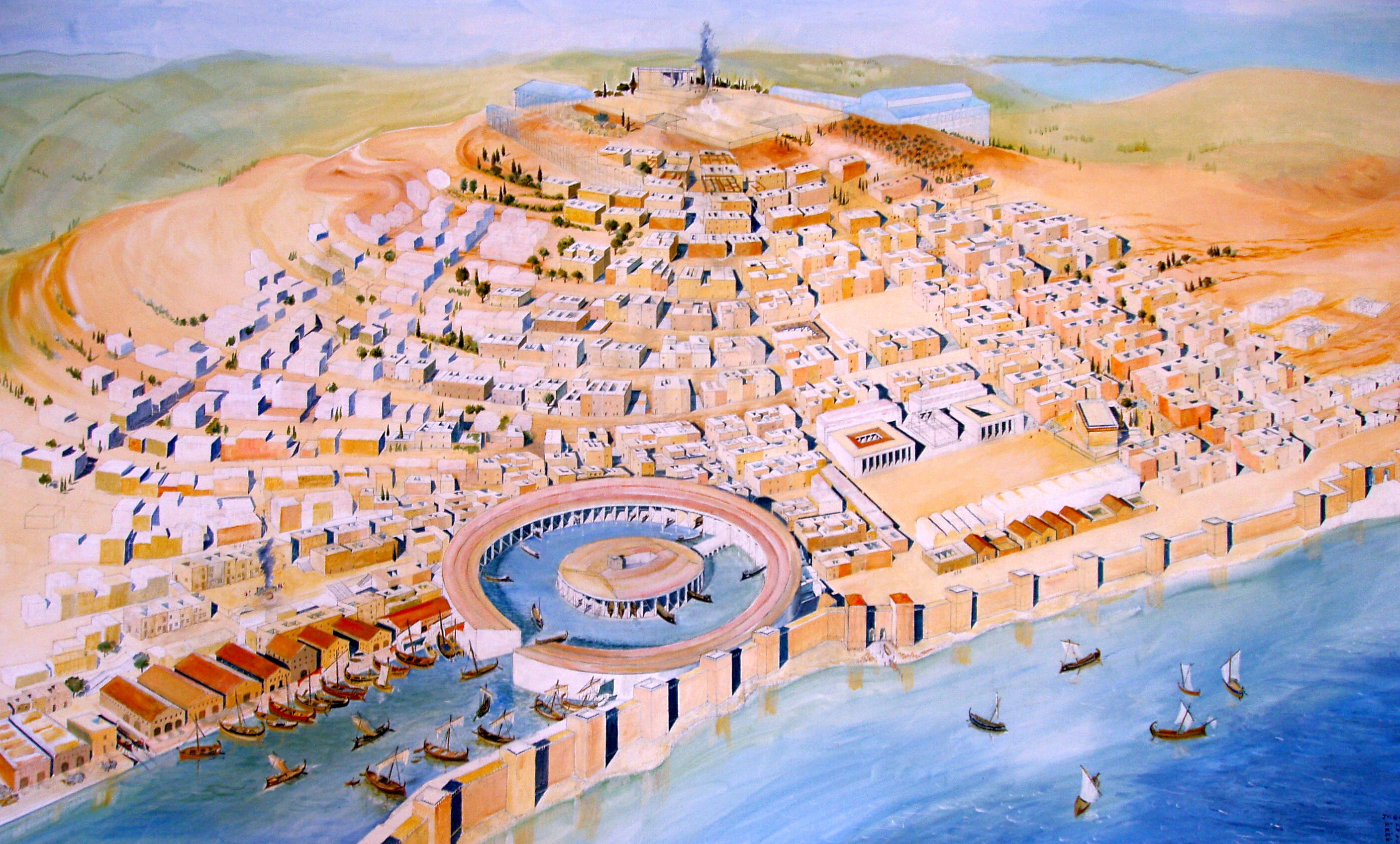
Representing the Punic city, the agora is the vast esplanade to the right of the circular port.

=== Civic body ===
According to Strabo, the population of Carthage was 700,000 at the time of the city's fall in 146, although this figure is disputed by scholars, for a city of around 300 hectares and a suburb covering an area of 25 km^{2}.

The population, made up of a majority of poor people or craftsmen and a minority of wealthy merchants, had a say in the city's affairs, but probably only the men. Slaves and freedmen had no political rights; on the other hand, some foreigners obtained civic rights, in particular as a result of services rendered. Hannibal, for example, promised citizenship to his soldiers in the event of victory.

Periodically, citizens were sent to the colonies, a possibility that disappeared with the loss of the empire after the first two Punic wars. Certain professions were undoubtedly excluded from the assembly.

=== Convocation procedures ===
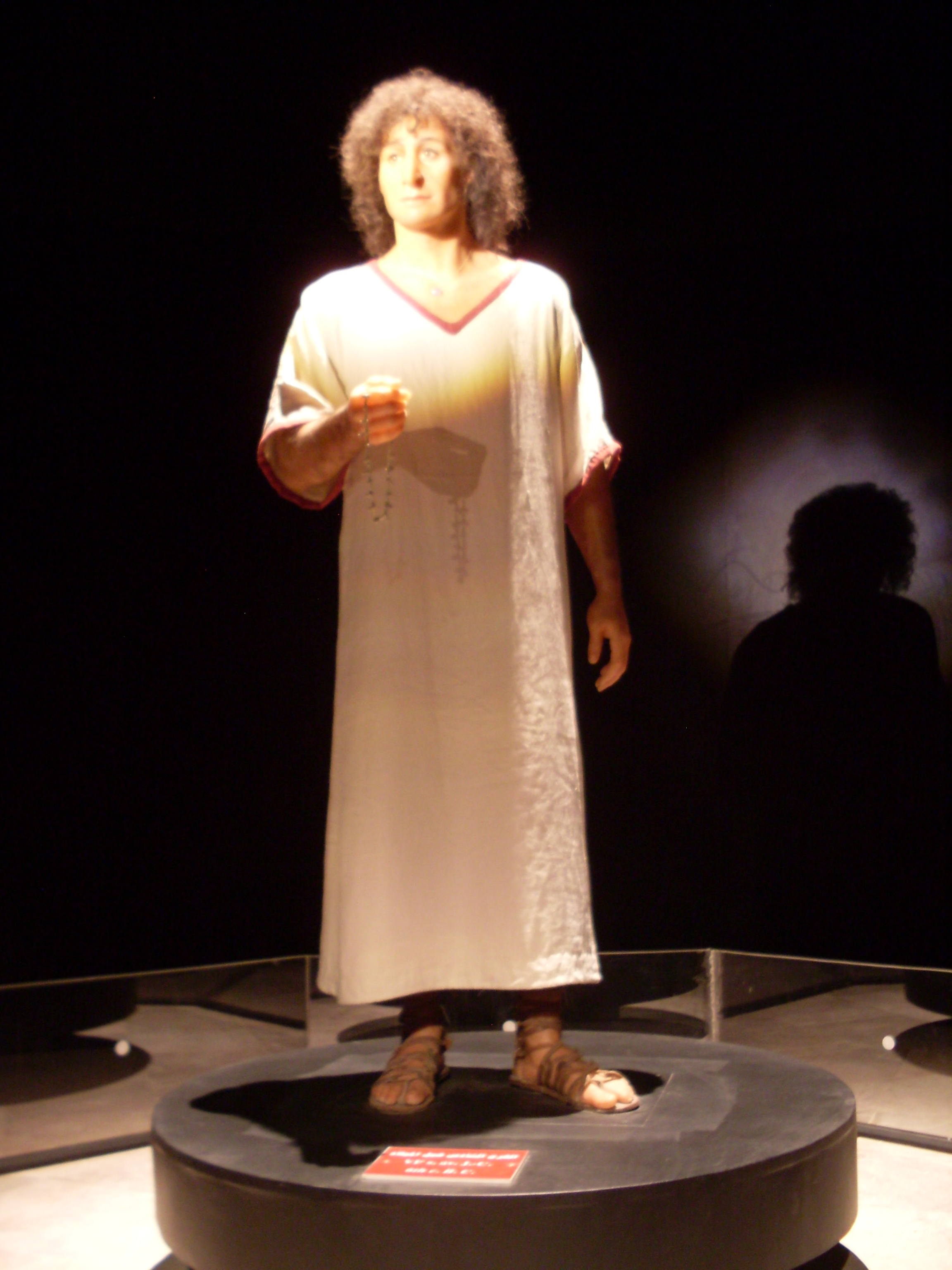
The Jeune homme de Byrsa.

Ordinary citizens had rights and duties in all Phoenician cities although, as far as we know, they did not hold assemblies outside the Punic capital. Justin relates that the people's assembly was convened at the time of Malchus' attempt to seize power in the 6th century BC.

A people's assembly is mentioned in Aristotle's text, and it is assumed that only free men were admitted. Some sources, including Diodorus of Sicily, mention a meeting on the city's agora, near the port district, although its precise location is unknown, and only when convened by the suffetes. Likewise, historians have assumed that only men with a certain cens can attend.

The citizens are convened by the suffetes or meet during dramatic events. According to François Decret, they elected the generals from the 2nd century BC onwards.

Certain matters are brought before this assembly in the event of disagreement between the oligarchic institutions, and also in the event of agreement, even if these assertions are not supported by any source other than Aristotle's text. Similarly, these oligarchic institutions must agree for a matter to be brought before the assembly. Magistrates and generals are elected by the assembly.

=== Growing power ===
If, for Aristotle, the popular mass is a fundamentally disruptive element, the philosopher emphasizes constitutional stability, which is seen as an "effect of chance". This argument is also valid for the period of Punic history after the author's: the fragile Carthaginian oligarchic regime could only have gone through serious periods by chance, particularly at the time of the Punic Wars.

If we are to believe Polybius, the people's assembly increased its power during the 2nd and 1st centuries BC, at the time of the Barcids, with the election of generals by the assembly and also, no doubt, the election of suffetes. However, the same author also refers to the widespread use of corruption to obtain magistracies and military commands.

=== Hetairies and syssities ===
Aristotle also mentions hetairies, political organizations that organized syssities, or communal meals. These organizations enabled citizens to choose their representatives in the assembly according to various criteria of age, wealth, and experience. These organizations appear to have played a political role, particularly in support of Hanno the Great.

In the end, the great uncertainties make it impossible to determine the degree of democracy in ancient Carthage, as the place of the citizens is unknown. There was no military service in Carthage, the army being made up of mercenaries, even if sources mention a fierce defense at the time of the Third Punic War.

== See also ==
- Politics (Aristotle)
- List of monarchs of Carthage
- Shophet
- Roman Senate
- History of Carthage

== Bibliography ==
=== Historical sources ===
- Appien. Libyca (in French).
- Aristote. Politique (in French).
- de Sicile, Diodore. Bibliothèque historique (in French).
- Hérodote. Histoires (in French).
- Justin. Epitomé Historiarum Philippicarum (in French).
- Polybe. Histoire (in French).
- Sénèque. De tranquillitate animi (in French).
- Tite-Live. Ab Urbe condita (in French).

=== Contemporary works ===
- Amadasi, Maria (2007). Carthage. Que sais-je ? (in French). Presses universitaires de France. ISBN 978-2-13-053962-9.
- Beschaouch, Azedine (1993). La légende de Carthage. Découvertes Gallimard / Archéologie (in French). Gallimard. ISBN 978-2-07-053212-4.
- Decret, François (1977). Carthage ou l'empire de la mer. Points / Histoire (in French). Éditions du Seuil. ISBN 978-2-02-004712-8.
- Dridi, Hédi (2006). Carthage et le monde punique. Guide Belles lettres des civilisations (in French). Les Belles lettres. ISBN 978-2-251-41033-3.
- Fantar (1995). Carthage : la cité punique (in French). CNRS Éditions. ISBN 978-2-271-05191-2.
- Hassine, M'hamed (1993). Carthage : approche d'une civilisation (in French). Alif.
- Gras, Michel; Rouillard, Pierre; Teixidor, Javier (1989). L'Univers phénicien (in French). Arthaud. ISBN 978-2-7003-0732-0.
- Gsell, Stéphane (1972). Histoire ancienne de l'Afrique du Nord, vol. 2 : Jules César et l'Afrique, fin des royaumes indigènes (in French). Otto Zeller.
- Lancel, Serge (1995). Carthage (in French). Fayard. ISBN 978-2-213-02838-5.
- Lipinski, Edward (1992). Dictionnaire de la civilisation phénicienne et punique (in French). Brepols. ISBN 978-2-503-50033-1.
- Sznycer, Maurice (1997). "Carthage et la civilisation punique". Rome et la conquête du monde méditerranéen (264-27 av. J.-C.). Nouvelle Clio. Presses Universitaires de France. ISBN 978-2-13-043913-4.
- Seston, Maurice (1989). "Carthage et la civilisation punique". Rome et la conquête du monde méditerranéen : genèse d'un empire. Nouvelle Clio (in French) (2nd ed.). Presses universitaires de France. ISBN 978-2-13-043913-4.
- Slim, Hédi (2001). La Tunisie antique : de Hannibal à Saint-Augustin (in French). Mengès. ISBN 978-2-85620-421-4.
