= Sadat, Khorramshahr =

Sadat سادات
- Village
- Location within Iran
- Coordinates: 30°21′27″N 48°11′40″E
- Country: Iran
- Province: Khuzestan
- County: Khorramshahr
- Bakhsh: Minu
- Rural District: Jazireh-ye Minu

Population (2006)
  - Total: 296
- Time zone: UTC+3:30 (IRST)
  - Summer (DST): UTC+4:30 (IRDT)

Sadat (Persian: سادات, also Romanized as Sādāt) is a village in Jazireh-ye Minu Rural District, Minu District, Khorramshahr County, Khuzestan Province, Iran. At the 2006 census, its population was 296, in 63 families.
