= Mazraeh, Khuzestan =

Mazraeh مزرعه
- Village
- Location within Iran
- Coordinates: 30°22′00″N 48°12′00″E
- Country: Iran
- Province: Khuzestan
- County: Khorramshahr
- Bakhsh: Minu
- Rural District: Jazireh-ye Minu

Population (2006)
  - Total: 297
- Time zone: UTC+3:30 (IRST)
  - Summer (DST): UTC+4:30 (IRDT)

Mazraeh (Persian: مزرعه, also Romanized as Mazra‘eh) is a village in Jazireh-ye Minu Rural District, Minu District, Khorramshahr County, Khuzestan Province, Iran. At the 2006 census, its population was 297, in 57 families.
