= Ghazbaniyeh =

Ghazbaniyeh غضبانيه
- Village
- Location within Iran
- Coordinates: 30°20′22″N 48°13′45″E
- Country: Iran
- Province: Khuzestan
- County: Khorramshahr
- Bakhsh: Minu
- Rural District: Jazireh-ye Minu

Population (2006)
  - Total: 59
- Time zone: UTC+3:30 (IRST)
  - Summer (DST): UTC+4:30 (IRDT)

Ghazbaniyeh (Persian: غضبانيه, also Romanized as Ghaẕbānīyeh; also known as Raddeh-ye Ghaẕbānīyeh) is a village in Jazireh-ye Minu Rural District, Minu District, Khorramshahr County, Khuzestan Province, Iran. At the 2006 census, its population was 59, in 11 families.
