= Omm ol Savad =

Omm ol Savad ام السواد
- Village
- Location within Iran
- Coordinates: 30°42′49″N 48°22′20″E
- Country: Iran
- Province: Khuzestan
- County: Khorramshahr
- Bakhsh: Central
- Rural District: Gharb-e Karun

Population (2006)
  - Total: 213
- Time zone: UTC+3:30 (IRST)
  - Summer (DST): UTC+4:30 (IRDT)

Omm ol Savad (Persian: ام السواد, also Romanized as Omm ol Savād, Omm os Savād, Om Sovād, and Ommolsavād; also known as Kharābehhā-ye Savādā, Savād, Suwadah, and Suwadeh) is a village in Gharb-e Karun Rural District, in the Central District of Khorramshahr County, Khuzestan Province, Iran. At the 2006 census, its population was 213 (comprised by 31 families).
