= Maqate =

Maqate مقاطع
- Village
- Location within Iran
- Coordinates: 30°21′02″N 48°12′36″E
- Country: Iran
- Province: Khuzestan
- County: Khorramshahr
- Bakhsh: Minu
- Rural District: Jazireh-ye Minu

Population (2006)
  - Total: 345
- Time zone: UTC+3:30 (IRST)
  - Summer (DST): UTC+4:30 (IRDT)

Maqate (Persian: مقاطع, also Romanized as Maqāţe‘; also known as Maqāţī‘) is a village in Jazireh-ye Minu Rural District, Minu District, Khorramshahr County, Khuzestan Province, Iran. At the 2006 census, its population was 345, in 71 families.
