= Rahmanniyeh =

Rahmanniyeh and Rahmaniyeh (Persian: رحمانيه) may refer to:

- Rahmaniyeh, Khuzestan
- Rahmaniyeh-ye Feysali, Khuzestan Province
- Rahmaniyeh-ye Kabi, Khuzestan Province
- Rahmaniyeh-ye Zabun, Khuzestan Province
- Rahmanniyeh, Razavi Khorasan
