= Najm-e Divan =

Najm-e Divan نجم ديوان
- Village
- Location within Iran
- Coordinates: 30°20′21″N 48°14′00″E
- Country: Iran
- Province: Khuzestan
- County: Khorramshahr
- Bakhsh: Minu
- Rural District: Jazireh-ye Minu

Population (2006)
  - Total: 12
- Time zone: UTC+3:30 (IRST)
  - Summer (DST): UTC+4:30 (IRDT)

Najm-e Divan (Persian: نجم ديوان, also romanized as Najm-e Dīvān; also known as Baḩrīyeh (Persian: بحريه) and Baḩrīyeh-ye Najm-e Dīvān) is a village in Jazireh-ye Minu Rural District, Minu District, Khorramshahr County, Khuzestan Province, Iran. At the 2006 census, its population was 12, in 4 families.
