= Gheysiyeh =

Gheysiyeh غيثيه
- Village
- Location within Iran
- Coordinates: 30°21′13″N 48°12′55″E
- Country: Iran
- Province: Khuzestan
- County: Khorramshahr
- Bakhsh: Minu
- Rural District: Jazireh-ye Minu

Population (2006)
  - Total: 214
- Time zone: UTC+3:30 (IRST)
  - Summer (DST): UTC+4:30 (IRDT)

Gheysiyeh (Persian: غيثيه, also Romanized as Gheys̄īyeh; also known as Gheysheh and Nahr-e Gheys̄īyeh) is a village in Jazireh-ye Minu Rural District, Minu District, Khorramshahr County, Khuzestan Province, Iran. In the 2006 census, the population was found to be 214, in 38 families.
