= Arayez =

Arayez عريض
- Village
- Location within Iran
- Coordinates: 30°29′19″N 48°07′29″E
- Country: Iran
- Province: Khuzestan
- County: Khorramshahr
- Bakhsh: Central
- Rural District: Howmeh-ye Gharbi

Population (2006)
  - Total: 97
- Time zone: UTC+3:30 (IRST)
  - Summer (DST): UTC+4:30 (IRDT)

Arayez (Persian: عريض, also Romanized as Ārāyez, ‘Arayeẕ, ‘Arāyeẕ, ‘Arayyeẕ, and ‘Arīyẕ) is a village in Howmeh-ye Gharbi Rural District, in the Central District of Khorramshahr County, Khuzestan Province, Iran. At the 2006 census, its population was 97, in 20 families.
