= Hamid Assad Khan =

Hamid Assad Khan حميداسدخان
- Village
- Country: Iran
- Province: Khuzestan
- County: Khorramshahr
- Bakhsh: Minu
- Rural District: Jazireh-ye Minu

Population (2006)
  - Total: 165
- Time zone: UTC+3:30 (IRST)
  - Summer (DST): UTC+4:30 (IRDT)

Hamid Assad Khan (Persian: حميداسدخان, also Romanized as Ḩamīd Āssad Khān) is a village in Jazireh-ye Minu Rural District, Minu District, Khorramshahr County, Khuzestan Province, Iran. At the 2006 census, its population was 165, in 30 families.
