= Sarhaniyeh-ye Sofla =

Sarhaniyeh-ye Sofla سرحانيه سفلي
- Village
- Location within Iran
- Coordinates: 30°27′32″N 48°08′56″E
- Country: Iran
- Province: Khuzestan
- County: Khorramshahr
- Bakhsh: Central
- Rural District: Howmeh-ye Gharbi

Population (2006)
  - Total: 1,191
- Time zone: UTC+3:30 (IRST)
  - Summer (DST): UTC+4:30 (IRDT)

Sarhaniyeh-ye Sofla (Persian: سرحانيه سفلي, also Romanized as Sarḩānīyeh-ye Soflá) is a village in Howmeh-ye Gharbi Rural District, in the Central District of Khorramshahr County, Khuzestan Province, Iran. At the 2006 census, its population was 1,191, in 251 families.
