= Mohanna =

Mohanna (Persian: مهنا) may refer to:

- Mohanna, Andika
- Mohanna, Khorramshahr
- Mohanna, Ramhormoz
