= Haffar, Iran =

Haffar حفار
- Village
- Location within Iran
- Coordinates: 30°20′58″N 48°14′04″E
- Country: Iran
- Province: Khuzestan
- County: Khorramshahr
- Bakhsh: Minu
- Rural District: Jazireh-ye Minu

Population (2006)
  - Total: 211
- Time zone: UTC+3:30 (IRST)
  - Summer (DST): UTC+4:30 (IRDT)

Haffar (Persian: حفار, also Romanized as Ḩaffār and Haffār) is a village in Jazireh-ye Minu Rural District, Minu District, Khorramshahr County, Khuzestan Province, Iran. The 2006 census corded the village population at 211 residents, in 39 families.
