= Omnowsheh =

Omnowsheh ام نوشه
- Village
- Location within Iran
- Coordinates: 30°50′11″N 48°25′41″E
- Country: Iran
- Province: Khuzestan
- County: Khorramshahr
- Bakhsh: Central
- Rural District: Gharb-e Karun

Population (2006)
  - Total: 114
- Time zone: UTC+3:30 (IRST)
  - Summer (DST): UTC+4:30 (IRDT)

Omnowsheh (Persian: ام نوشه, also Romanized as Omm ol Nowsheh) is a village in Gharb-e Karun Rural District, in the Central District of Khorramshahr County, Khuzestan Province, Iran. At the 2006 census, its population was 114, in 19 families.
