= Naimiyeh-ye Seyyed Naser =

Naimiyeh-ye Seyyed Naser نعميه سيدناصر
- Village
- Location within Iran
- Coordinates: 30°21′03″N 48°11′47″E
- Country: Iran
- Province: Khuzestan
- County: Khorramshahr
- Bakhsh: Minu
- Rural District: Jazireh-ye Minu

Population (2006)
  - Total: 40
- Time zone: UTC+3:30 (IRST)
  - Summer (DST): UTC+4:30 (IRDT)

Naimiyeh-ye Seyyed Naser (Persian: نعميه سيدناصر, also Romanized as Na‘īmīyeh-ye Seyyed Nāşer; also known as Na‘mīyeh-ye Nāşer) is a village in Jazireh-ye Minu Rural District, Minu District, Khorramshahr County, Khuzestan Province, Iran. At the 2006 census, its population was 40, in 7 families.
