= Rahmaniyeh-ye Zabun =

Rahmaniyeh-ye Zabun رحمانيه زبون
- Village
- Country: Iran
- Province: Khuzestan
- County: Khorramshahr
- Bakhsh: Central
- Rural District: Gharb-e Karun

Population (2006)
  - Total: 28
- Time zone: UTC+3:30 (IRST)
  - Summer (DST): UTC+4:30 (IRDT)

Rahmaniyeh-ye Zabun (Persian: رحمانيه زبون, also Romanized as Raḥmānīyeh-ye Zabūn) is a small village in Gharb-e Karun Rural District, in the Central District of Khorramshahr County, Khuzestan Province, Iran. At the 2006 census, its population was 28, in 6 families.
