= Sabeh =

Village in Khuzestan province, Iran

Sabeh Persian: سبعه
- Village
- Location within Iran
- Coordinates: 30°55′41″N 48°20′26″E
- Country: Iran
- Province: Khuzestan
- County: Khorramshahr
- District: Central
- Rural District: Gharb-e Karun

Population (2016)
  - Total: 980
- Time zone: UTC+3:30 (IRST)

Sabeh (Persian: سبعه) (Note: Also romanized as Sab‘eh; also known as Sab‘eh-ye Yek) is a village in Gharb-e Karun Rural District of the Central District of Khorramshahr County, Khuzestan province, Iran.

== Demographics ==
=== Population ===
At the time of the 2006 National Census, the village's population was 871 in 151 households. The following census in 2011 counted 877 people in 193 households. The 2016 census measured the population of the village as 980 people in 242 households. It was the most populous village in its rural district.
