= Mamlah-ye Olya =

Mamlah-ye Olya مملح عليا
- Village
- Location within Iran
- Coordinates: 30°50′47″N 48°26′33″E
- Country: Iran
- Province: Khuzestan
- County: Khorramshahr
- Bakhsh: Central
- Rural District: Gharb-e Karun

Population (2006)
  - Total: 60
- Time zone: UTC+3:30 (IRST)
  - Summer (DST): UTC+4:30 (IRDT)

Mamlah-ye Olya (Persian: مملح عليا, also Romanized as Mamlaḥ-ye ‘Olyā and Mamlah-ye ‘Olyā) is a village in Gharb-e Karun Rural District, in the Central District of Khorramshahr County, Khuzestan Province, Iran. At the 2006 census, its population was 60, in 11 families.
