= Moammereh, Minu =

Moammereh معمره
- Village
- Location within Iran
- Coordinates: 30°23′43″N 48°15′23″E
- Country: Iran
- Province: Khuzestan
- County: Khorramshahr
- Bakhsh: Minu
- Rural District: Jazireh-ye Minu

Population (2006)
  - Total: 808
- Time zone: UTC+3:30 (IRST)
  - Summer (DST): UTC+4:30 (IRDT)

Moammereh (Persian: معمره, also Romanized as Mo‘ammereh; also known as Mo‘ammarā Sangūr, Mo‘ammarā Sangūr, Moammare, Mo‘ammareh Şangūr, Mo‘ammareh Şongūr, Mo‘ammareh-ye Şangūr, and Nowābād) is a village in Jazireh-ye Minu Rural District, Minu District, Khorramshahr County, Khuzestan Province, Iran. At the 2006 census, its population was 808, in 164 families.
