= Sabah (disambiguation) =

Sabah is a state in Malaysia. It may also refer to:

== Given name ==
- Sabah (singer) (1927–2014), Lebanese singer and actress
- Sabah al-Alwani, Yemeni judge
- Sabah Zita Benson (born 1975), Ghanaian lawyer, diplomat, and politician
- Sabah Bizi (1946–2025), Albanian footballer
- Sabah Choudrey, English activist, speaker, and writer
- Sabah Fakhri (1933–2021), Syrian tenor singer
- Sabah Al-Fatlawi (died 2018), Iraqi major general
- Sabah Ferdi (born 1954), Algerian researcher, archaeologist, museum curator, and academic
- Sabah Hamamou, Egyptian journalist
- Sabah Hatim (born 1950), Iraqi footballer
- Sabah Homasi (born 1988), American mixed martial artist and bare-knuckle boxer
- Sabah I bin Jaber (1700–1762), Kuwaiti royal
- Sabah Jadoua (born 1987), Saudi footballer
- Sabah Abdul-Jalil (1951–2021), Iraqi footballer
- Sabah Jazairi (born 1957), Syrian actress
- Sabah Jeayer (born 1970), Iraqi footballer
- Sabah Kerjota (born 2001), Albanian footballer
- Sabah Khodir (born 1991), Egyptian-American poet and activist
- Sabah Khoury (born 1982), Lebanese basketball player
- Sabah Koj (born 1998), South Sudanese-Australian fashion model
- Sabah Mirza Mahmoud (1943–2005), Iraqi military colonel
- Sabah Mohamed (born 1980), Maldivian footballer
- Sabah Habas Mustapha (born 1951), bassist with the progressive rock band Camel, also known as Colin Bass
- Sabah Naim (born 1967), Egyptian multimedia artist
- Sabah Obaid (1950–2013), Syrian television director and actor
- Sabah Qabbani (1928–2015), Syrian ambassador
- Sabah Randhawa (born 1954), American academic administrator
- Sabah II Al-Sabah (1784–1866), Kuwaiti royal
- Sabah Al-Ahmad Al-Jaber Al-Sabah (1929–2020), Kuwaiti royal
- Sabah Al-Khalid Al-Sabah (born 1953), Kuwaiti royal and politician
- Sabah Al-Salim Al-Sabah (1913–1977), Kuwaiti royal
- Sabah al-Saedi (born 1974), Iraqi politician
- Sabah Sanhouri (born 1990), Sudanese fiction writer
- Sabah Seghir (born 2000), Moroccan-Swiss footballer
- Sabah Shariati (born 1989), Iranian-Azerbaijani wrestler
- Sabah Tani (died 2018), Bangladeshi singer

== Surname ==
- Miguel Sabah (born 1979), Mexican footballer

== Other uses ==
- Sabah (film), a 2005 Canadian film
- Sabah (music), a Turkmen term for a musical scale
- Sabah (newspaper), a Turkish newspaper
- Sabah, Iran, a village in Khuzestan Province, Iran
- Sabah FK (Azerbaijan), an Azerbaijani football club
- Sabah F.C. (Malaysia), a Malaysian football club
- Sabah Wildlife Department, in Sabah, Malaysia
- MV Sabah, a Bornean coaster
- House of Al-Sabah, the ruling family of Kuwait
- sabah (صَبَاح ṣabāḥ), Arabic word for "morning", used for the fajr prayer

== See also ==
- Daily Sabah, a Turkish newspaper
- Sabbah (disambiguation)
- Saba (disambiguation)
- Sabha (disambiguation)
