= Kofeysheh =

Kofeysheh or Kafisheh (Persian: كفيشه) may refer to:

- Kofeysheh, Khorramshahr
- Kafisheh, Shadegan
