= Soveychti-ye Yek =

Soveychti-ye Yek سوي چيتي يك
- Village
- Location within Iran
- Coordinates: 30°53′16″N 48°23′38″E
- Country: Iran
- Province: Khuzestan
- County: Khorramshahr
- Bakhsh: Central
- Rural District: Gharb-e Karun

Population (2006)
  - Total: 273
- Time zone: UTC+3:30 (IRST)
  - Summer (DST): UTC+4:30 (IRDT)

Soveychti-ye Yek (Persian: سوي چيتي يك, also Romanized as Soveychtī-ye Yek; also known as Soveyḩetī-ye Yek) is a village in Gharb-e Karun Rural District, in the Central District of Khorramshahr County, Khuzestan Province, Iran. At the 2006 census, its population was 273, in 46 families.
