= Ra's =

Ra's (Persian: راس) may refer to:

- Ra's-e Jonubi
- Ra's-e Sharqi
- Ra's al Ghul

== See also ==
- Resh, a letter in the Arabic alphabet
