= Ras-e Jonubi =

Ras-e Jonubi راس جنوبي
- Village
- Location within Iran
- Coordinates: 30°20′29″N 48°14′27″E
- Country: Iran
- Province: Khuzestan
- County: Khorramshahr
- Bakhsh: Minu
- Rural District: Jazireh-ye Minu

Population (2006)
  - Total: 220
- Time zone: UTC+3:30 (IRST)
  - Summer (DST): UTC+4:30 (IRDT)

Ras-e Jonubi (Persian: راس جنوبي, also Romanized as Ra's-e Jonūbī; also known as Būzeh Rāsat (Persian: بوزه راست) and Raddeh-ye 'Āmerī) is a village in Jazireh-ye Minu Rural District, Minu District, Khorramshahr County, Khuzestan province, Iran. At the 2006 census, its population was 220, in 45 families.
