= Mamlah =

Mamlah (Persian: مملح) may refer to:

- Shahrak-e Mamlah - town of Mamlah, Ilam Province
- Mamlah-ye Olya - upper Mamlah, Khuzestan Province
