= Sharieh-ye Seyyed Abud =

Sharieh-ye Seyyed Abud شريعه سيدعبود
- Village
- Country: Iran
- Province: Khuzestan
- County: Khorramshahr
- Bakhsh: Central
- Rural District: Gharb-e Karun

Population (2006)
  - Total: 39
- Time zone: UTC+3:30 (IRST)
  - Summer (DST): UTC+4:30 (IRDT)

Sharieh-ye Seyyed Abud (Persian: شريعه سيدعبود, also Romanized as Sharīʿeh-ye Seyyed ʿAbūd) is a village in Gharb-e Karun Rural District, in the Central District of Khorramshahr County, Khuzestan Province, Iran. At the 2006 census, its population was 39, in 5 families.
