= Sabeh-ye Do =

Sabeh-ye Do سبعه دو
- Village
- Location within Iran
- Coordinates: 30°55′18″N 48°20′29″E
- Country: Iran
- Province: Khuzestan
- County: Khorramshahr
- Bakhsh: Central
- Rural District: Gharb-e Karun

Population (2006)
  - Total: 55
- Time zone: UTC+3:30 (IRST)
  - Summer (DST): UTC+4:30 (IRDT)

Sabeh-ye Do (Persian: سبعه دو, also Romanized as Sab‘eh-ye Do; also known as Sab‘ah and Sab‘eh) is a village in Gharb-e Karun Rural District, in the Central District of Khorramshahr County, Khuzestan Province, Iran. At the 2006 census, its population was 55, in 13 families.
