= Sharieh =

Shariyeh (Persian: شريعه) may refer to:

- Sharieh-ye Omm-e Teman
- Sharieh-ye Seyyed Abud
