= Haffar-e Sharqi =

Village in Khuzestan province, Iran

Haffar-e Sharqi Persian: حفار شرقي
- Village
- Location within Iran
- Coordinates: 30°26′25″N 48°12′50″E
- Country: Iran
- Province: Khuzestan
- County: Khorramshahr
- District: Central
- Rural District: Howmeh-ye Sharqi

Population (2016)
  - Total: 2,297
- Time zone: UTC+3:30 (IRST)

Haffar-e Sharqi (Persian: حفارشرقي) (Note: Also romanized as Ḩaffār-e Sharqī and Haffār-e Sharqī) is a village in, and the capital of, Howmeh-ye Sharqi Rural District of the Central District of Khorramshahr County, Khuzestan province, Iran.

== Demographics ==
=== Population ===
At the time of the 2006 National Census, the village's population was 1,980 in 411 households. The following census in 2011 counted 2,266 people in 589 households. The 2016 census measured the population of the village as 2,297 people in 604 households.
