= Soveychti-ye Do =

Soveychti-ye Do سوي چيتي دو
- Village
- Location within Iran
- Coordinates: 30°52′37″N 48°26′05″E
- Country: Iran
- Province: Khuzestan
- County: Khorramshahr
- Bakhsh: Central
- Rural District: Gharb-e Karun

Population (2006)
  - Total: 434
- Time zone: UTC+3:30 (IRST)
  - Summer (DST): UTC+4:30 (IRDT)

Soveychti-ye Do (Persian: سوي چيتي دو, also Romanized as Soveychtī-ye Do; also known as Soveychetī-ye Do-ye Soflá, Soveychetī-ye Marhach, Soveychtī, Soveychtī-ye Marhech, Soveychtī-ye Rahach, and Soveychtī-ye Yek) is a village in Gharb-e Karun Rural District, in the Central District of Khorramshahr County, Khuzestan Province, Iran. At the 2006 census, its population was 434, in 77 families.
