= Pol-e Now =

Village in Khuzestan province, Iran

Pol-e Now Persian: پل نو
- Village
- Location within Iran
- Coordinates: 30°28′18″N 48°07′40″E
- Country: Iran
- Province: Khuzestan
- County: Khorramshahr
- District: Central
- Rural District: Howmeh-ye Gharbi

Population (2016)
  - Total: 1,084
- Time zone: UTC+3:30 (IRST)

Pol-e Now (Persian: پل نو) is a village in, and the capital of, Howmeh-ye Gharbi Rural District of the Central District of Khorramshahr County, Khuzestan province, Iran.

== Demographics ==
=== Population ===
At the time of the 2006 National Census, the village's population was 488 in 103 households. The following census in 2011 counted 661 people in 170 households. The 2016 census measured the population of the village as 1,084 people in 277 households.
