= Jabbar Abd ol Emam =

Village in Khuzestan province, Iran

Jabbar Abd ol Emam Persian: جبارعبدالامام
- Village
- Location within Iran
- Coordinates: 30°21′50″N 48°12′28″E
- Country: Iran
- Province: Khuzestan
- County: Khorramshahr
- District: Minu
- Rural District: Jazireh-ye Minu

Population (2016)
  - Total: 1,086
- Time zone: UTC+3:30 (IRST)

Jabbar Abd ol Emam (Persian: جبارعبدالامام) (Note: Also romanized as Jabbār ‘Abd ol Emām; also known as ‘Abd ol Emām) is a village in Jazireh-ye Minu Rural District of Minu District, Khorramshahr County, Khuzestan province, Iran.

== Demographics ==
=== Population ===
At the time of the 2006 National Census, the village's population was 948 in 213 households. The following census in 2011 counted 1,125 people in 296 households. The 2016 census measured the population of the village as 1,086 people in 300 households. It was the most populous village in its rural district.
