= Hasan-e Mazlum =

Hasan-e Mazlum حسن مظلوم
- Village
- Country: Iran
- Province: Khuzestan
- County: Khorramshahr
- Bakhsh: Minu
- Rural District: Jazireh-ye Minu

Population (2006)
  - Total: 27
- Time zone: UTC+3:30 (IRST)
  - Summer (DST): UTC+4:30 (IRDT)

Hasan-e Mazlum (Persian: حسن مظلوم, also Romanized as Ḩasan-e Maẓlūm; also known as ʿĀsmīyeh) is a village in Jazireh-ye Minu Rural District, Minu District, Khorramshahr County, Khuzestan Province, Iran. At the 2006 census, its population was 27, in 5 families.
