= Soveychti-ye Seh =

Soveychti-ye Seh سوئ چيتي سه
- Village
- Location within Iran
- Coordinates: 30°51′04″N 48°24′39″E
- Country: Iran
- Province: Khuzestan
- County: Khorramshahr
- Bakhsh: Central
- Rural District: Gharb-e Karun

Population (2006)
  - Total: 371
- Time zone: UTC+3:30 (IRST)
  - Summer (DST): UTC+4:30 (IRDT)

Soveychti-ye Seh (Persian: سوئ چيتي سه, also Romanized as Soveychtī-ye Seh; also known as Sovicheti-ye Seh) is a village in Gharb-e Karun Rural District, in the Central District of Khorramshahr County, Khuzestan Province, Iran. At the 2006 census, its population was 371, in 68 families.
