= Ras-e Sharqi =

Ras-e Sharqi راس شرقي
- Village
- Location within Iran
- Coordinates: 30°20′42″N 48°14′31″E
- Country: Iran
- Province: Khuzestan
- County: Khorramshahr
- Bakhsh: Minu
- Rural District: Jazireh-ye Minu

Population (2006)
  - Total: 36
- Time zone: UTC+3:30 (IRST)
  - Summer (DST): UTC+4:30 (IRDT)

Ras-e Sharqi (Persian: راس شرقي, also Romanized as Ra's-e Sharqī) is a village in Jazireh-ye Minu Rural District, Minu District, Khorramshahr County, Khuzestan province, Iran. At the 2006 census, its population was 36, in 8 families.
