= Naimiyeh, Khuzestan =

Naimiyeh نعميه
- Village
- Location within Iran
- Coordinates: 30°21′22″N 48°12′23″E
- Country: Iran
- Province: Khuzestan
- County: Khorramshahr
- Bakhsh: Minu
- Rural District: Jazireh-ye Minu

Population (2006)
  - Total: 109
- Time zone: UTC+3:30 (IRST)
  - Summer (DST): UTC+4:30 (IRDT)

Naimiyeh (Persian: نعميه, also Romanized as Na‘īmīyeh; also known as Na‘īmeh, Na‘īmīyeh-ye Asad Khān, and Na‘mīyeh-ye Asad Khān) is a village in the Jazireh-ye Minu Rural District, Minu District, Khorramshahr County, Khuzestan Province, Iran. According to the 2006 census, the population of Naimiyeh was 109, and was made up of 20 families.
