= Qosbeh-ye Maniat =

Qosbeh-ye Maniat قصبه منيعات
- Village
- Location within Iran
- Coordinates: 30°29′46″N 48°17′11″E
- Country: Iran
- Province: Khuzestan
- County: Khorramshahr
- Bakhsh: Central
- Rural District: Howmeh-ye Sharqi

Population (2006)
  - Total: 52
- Time zone: UTC+3:30 (IRST)
  - Summer (DST): UTC+4:30 (IRDT)

Qosbeh-ye Maniat (Persian: قصبه منيعات, also Romanized as Qoşbeh-ye Manī‘āt; also known as Gusbah, Qaşabeh, Qaşabeh-ye Meyghāt, Qisbeh, and Qoşbeh) is a village in Howmeh-ye Sharqi Rural District, in the Central District of Khorramshahr County, Khuzestan Province, Iran. At the 2006 census, its population was 52, in 13 families.
