= Rahmaniyeh-ye Kabi =

Rahmaniyeh-ye Kabi رحمانيه كعبي
- Village
- Location within Iran
- Coordinates: 30°53′17″N 48°22′56″E
- Country: Iran
- Province: Khuzestan
- County: Khorramshahr
- Bakhsh: Central
- Rural District: Gharb-e Karun

Population (2006)
  - Total: 274
- Time zone: UTC+3:30 (IRST)
  - Summer (DST): UTC+4:30 (IRDT)

Rahmaniyeh-ye Kabi (Persian: رحمانيه كعبي, also Romanized as Raḩīmānīyeh-ye Ka‘bī; also known as Rabaimamyeh, Raḩīmānīyeh, Rahmānia, Raḩmānī-ye Jadīd, and Raḩmanī-ye Ka‘bī) is a village in Gharb-e Karun Rural District, in the Central District of Khorramshahr County, Khuzestan Province, Iran. At the 2006 census, its population was 274, in 55 families.
