= Sharieh-ye Omm-e Teman =

Sharieh-ye Omm-e Teman شريعه ام تمن
- Village
- Location within Iran
- Coordinates: 30°54′43″N 48°21′03″E
- Country: Iran
- Province: Khuzestan
- County: Khorramshahr
- Bakhsh: Central
- Rural District: Gharb-e Karun

Population (2006)
  - Total: 182
- Time zone: UTC+3:30 (IRST)
  - Summer (DST): UTC+4:30 (IRDT)

Sharieh-ye Omm-e Teman (Persian: شريعه ام تمن, also Romanized as Sharīʿeh-ye Omm-e Teman) is a village in Gharb-e Karun Rural District, in the Central District of Khorramshahr County, Khuzestan Province, Iran. At the 2006 census, its population was 182, in 29 families.
