= Sowreh, Khuzestan =

Village in Khuzestan province, Iran

Sowreh Persian: سوره
- Village
- Location within Iran
- Coordinates: 30°27′15″N 48°08′20″E
- Country: Iran
- Province: Khuzestan
- County: Khorramshahr
- District: Central
- Rural District: Howmeh-ye Gharbi

Population (2016)
  - Total: 3,355
- Time zone: UTC+3:30 (IRST)

Sowreh (Persian: سوره) (Note: Also romanized as Sūreh) is a village in Howmeh-ye Gharbi Rural District of the Central District of Khorramshahr County, Khuzestan province, Iran.

== Demographics ==
=== Population ===
At the time of the 2006 National Census, the village's population was 3,255 in 674 households. The following census in 2011 counted 3,941 people in 944 households. The 2016 census measured the population of the village as 3,355 people in 958 households. It was the most populous village in its rural district.
