= Sabbah =

Sabbah could refer to:

- Abū Yūsuf Yaʿqūb ibn Isḥāq al-Ṣabbāḥ Al-Kindi (ca. 801–873): Arab scientist, mathematician, physician
- Hassan-i Sabbah (died 1124): Iranian Ismā'īlī Nizarī missionary and founder of the Hashshashins
- Hassan Kamel Al-Sabbah (1895-1935): Lebanese electronics research engineer
- Cheb i Sabbah (1947-2013) Algerian DJ of Jewish descent
- Claude Sabbah (born 1954) is a French mathematician and researcher at École polytechnique
- Maurice ‘Chico’ Sabbah: co-owner of Fortress Re
- Sabbah (Jezzin): a village in the southern mountains of Lebanon, see Municipalities of Lebanon

== See also ==
- Sabah (disambiguation)
