= Rahmaniyeh-ye Feysali =

Rahmaniyeh-ye Feysali رحمانيه فيصلي
- Village
- Location within Iran
- Coordinates: 30°54′17″N 48°21′46″E
- Country: Iran
- Province: Khuzestan
- County: Khorramshahr
- Bakhsh: Central
- Rural District: Gharb-e Karun

Population (2006)
  - Total: 387
- Time zone: UTC+3:30 (IRST)
  - Summer (DST): UTC+4:30 (IRDT)

Rahmaniyeh-ye Feysali (Persian: رحمانيه فيصلي, also Romanized as Raḩmānīyeh-ye Feyşalī; also known as Raḩmānī, Raḩmānī-ye do, Raḩmānī-ye Feyşalī, Raḩmānīyeh, and Raḩmānī-ye Qadīm) is a village in Gharb-e Karun Rural District, in the Central District of Khorramshahr County, Khuzestan Province, Iran. At the 2006 census, its population was 387, in 56 families.
