= Shoftim =

Shoftim, Shof'tim, or Shofetim (שופטים), Hebrew for “judges,” may mean:

- The plural of Shofet, judge
- Sefer Shoftim (ספר שופטים), the Hebrew name for the Book of Judges
- Shofetim (parsha) (פרשה שופטים), the 48th weekly parshah or portion in the annual Jewish cycle of Torah reading and the fifth in the book of Deuteronomy
- The 14th book of the Mishneh Torah, the code of Jewish law by Maimonides
