= Samadiyeh =

Samadiyeh (Persian: صمديه) may refer to:

- Samadiyeh, Khuzestan
- Samadiyeh, Razavi Khorasan
