= Moammareh, Khorramshahr =

Village in Khuzestan province, Iran

Moammareh Persian: معمره
- Village
- Location within Iran
- Coordinates: 30°21′57″N 48°12′37″E
- Country: Iran
- Province: Khuzestan
- County: Khorramshahr
- District: Central
- Rural District: Howmeh-ye Sharqi

Population (2016)
  - Total: 2,747
- Time zone: UTC+3:30 (IRST)

Moammareh (Persian: معمره) (Note: Also romanized as Mo‘ammareh; also known as Mo‘ammareh Ghisheh) is a village in Howmeh-ye Sharqi Rural District of the Central District of Khorramshahr County, Khuzestan province, Iran.

== Demographics ==
=== Population ===
At the time of the 2006 National Census, the village's population was 1,931 in 365 households. The following census in 2011 counted 2,542 people in 657 households. The 2016 census measured the population of the village as 2,747 people in 780 households. It was the most populous village in its rural district.
