= Kofeysheh, Khorramshahr =

Village in Khuzestan province, Iran

Kofeysheh Persian: كفيشه
- Village
- Location within Iran
- Coordinates: 30°46′47″N 48°25′26″E
- Country: Iran
- Province: Khuzestan
- County: Khorramshahr
- District: Central
- Rural District: Gharb-e Karun

Population (2016)
  - Total: 404
- Time zone: UTC+3:30 (IRST)

Kofeysheh (Persian: كفيشه) (Note: Also known as Kūfeysheh and Kūmnīsheh) is a village in, and the capital of, Gharb-e Karun Rural District of the Central District of Khorramshahr County, Khuzestan province, Iran.

== Demographics ==
=== Population ===
At the time of the 2006 National Census, the village's population was 366 in 68 households. The following census in 2011 counted 294 people in 62 households. The 2016 census measured the population of the village as 404 people in 100 households.
