= Teman =

Teman or Teiman may refer to:

- Teman or Teiman, the Hebrew for Yemen, homeland of the Temani or Teimani, the Yemenite Jews
  - In the Tanakh, Job's friend Eliphaz was a Temani
- In the Book of Genesis, Teman is a son of Eliphaz, Esau's eldest son
- Teman (Edom), an Edomite clan and an ancient biblical town of Arabia Petraea
- Teman Mono-Fly, an American ultralight aircraft designed by structural engineer Bob Teman and produced by Teman Aircraft, Inc.

== See also ==
- Sharieh-ye Omm-e Teman, a village in Gharb-e Karun Rural District, in the Central District of Khorramshahr County, Khuzestan Province, Iran
