= Mazlum =

Mazlum (maẓlūm) is an Arabic term for "oppressed, ill-treated, injured, sinned-against" (the antonym being ẓālim "oppressor"; root ẓlm "to oppress").

In Shiism, the term adopted a meaning of "pietistic" tolerance, given as a byname to Husayn ibn Ali, who was killed in the Battle of Karbala. The term is used for a person who is unwilling to act against an injustice, not out of cowardice but out of generosity or forbearance.

It came to be used as a male given name in the Perso-Arabic cultural sphere, and later also in Turkish, pronounced [ˈmazɫum].

People named Mazlum include:

- Mazloum Abdi, Syrian Kurdish general
- Mazlum Çimen, Turkish musician
- Mazlum Demir (born 2003), Turkish racewalker
- Mazlum Doğan, Kurdish activist
- Mazlum Kayalar, Turkish politician
- a character in the medieval Arabic drama Delhemma

== See also ==
- Hasan-e Mazlum, village in Iran
