= Dayer =

Dayer may refer to:

- Dayer, Khuzestan, a village in Iran
- Bandar Deyr, a city in Bushehr Province, Iran
- Dayêr, village in Tibet
