= Carthaginian Senate =

Adirim 𐤀𐤃𐤉𐤓𐤌
- Sign of Tanit, most commonly representing Carthage

Type
- Type: Unicameral house
- Houses: Synkletos; Gerousia
- Term limits: Depends on the house

History
- Founded: c. 450 BC; 2476 years ago
- Disbanded: c. 146 BC
- Preceded by: Carthaginian Monarchy
- Succeeded by: Roman Carthage
- Seats: 30

Meeting place
- Carthage, Carthaginian Empire

Constitution
- Constitution of Carthage

The Carthaginian Senate, or the Adirim, was the main governing body of the ancient Carthaginian Empire. Throughout its history, it was mainly ruled by groups of families, such as the Barcids, who dominated the senate during the Punic Wars. The senate would annually elect a suffete to rule the empire. The suffete system replaced the initial monarchy sometime in the early 7th century BC, and the senate would eventually start electing multiple suffetes from the 5th century BC onward, with one suffete to command the armed forces when at war, and the other for domestic matters.

== Composition ==
There were two houses in the Carthaginian Senate: the Synkletos and Gerousia. Alongside the houses, there was a popular assembly known as the Ham ("the people"). Not much is known about the Ham, but it was likely a representative body that might have consisted of all citizens early in the country's history.

The Synkletos were 104 annually elected members of the Adirim who served on a tribunal for the judgement of generals. Generals who lost battles or showed ineptitude were judged and, if found guilty, were eligible for fines and execution, most famously by crucifixion. In 344, Mago, after facing a major defeat in Sicily, committed suicide to avoid his inevitable crucifixion. After hearing this, the Synkletos crucified his corpse.

The Gerousia were 30 aristocratic and noble peoples who had the ability to declare war. They were the body, regularly in session, in which the effective government of Carthage was lodged.

In order to pass a law, the two suffetes would need to approve it. Afterwards, it would be sent to the Adirim for deliberation. If the Adirim fails to deliberate, the law will be passed to the Ham.

== History ==
=== Early history ===
When the senate was created in c. 450 BC, the senate must have consisted of around 100 senators. Around the 4th century BC, it was likely ruled by a group of several hundred elders of the Republic.

=== The Punic Wars ===
Throughout the Punic Wars, the Carthaginian Senate repeatedly clashed with generals out in combat, more specifically, those of the Barcid family. The repeated stubbornness of Rome caused the rise of an anti-war faction, led by Hanno II, which prevented aid from being sent to Hannibal while he was campaigning in Southern Italy.

During the period between the Second and Third Punic War, Carthage had been thriving. In 201 BC, the Romans forbade Carthage from engaging in any wars without Rome's explicit approval. However, in 149, tensions erupted between Carthage and the Kingdom of Numidia. Due to their prior treaty, Rome began to invade Carthage, sparking the Third Punic War.

=== Dissolution ===
Following the Siege of Carthage in the Third Punic War, the Carthaginian Senate was abolished by Rome.
