= Sureh =

Sureh or Sowreh (Persian: سوره) may refer to:

- Sureh, Hormozgan
- Sureh, Khuzestan
- Sureh, Razavi Khorasan
- Sureh, Tehran
- Sureh, West Azerbaijan
