= Moqavemat =

City in Khuzestan province, Iran

Moqavemat Persian: مقاومت
- City
- Location within Iran
- Coordinates: 30°26′50″N 48°10′05″E
- Country: Iran
- Province: Khuzestan
- County: Khorramshahr
- District: Central
- Established as a municipality: 2016
- Time zone: UTC+3:30 (IRST)

Moqavemat (Persian: مقاومت) (Note: Formerly Kut-e Sheykh (کوت شیخ) neighborhood in the city of Khorramshahr) is a city in the Central District of Khorramshahr County, Khuzestan province, Iran. The city's name translates as "resistance," a reference to the Iran–Iraq War. Moqavemat is adjacent to Khorramshahr.

== History ==
After the 2016 National Census, Kut-e Sheykh neighborhood in the city of Khorramshahr was elevated to city status as Moqavemat.
