= Sabah Ferdi =

French archaeologist and researcher

- Arabic: صَبَاحْ فَرْدِي
- Born: 4 June 1954 (age 72)
- Occupations: researcher and curator

Academic background
- Education: University of Provence; Pontifical Institute of Christian Archaeology

Academic work
- Discipline: archaeology
- Institutions: Archaeological Museum of Cherchell; Tipasa Museum; National Center for Research in Archaeology
- Main interests: Roman and early Christian and medieval art of North Africa

Sabah Ferdi (Arabic: صَبَاحْ فَرْدِي, Ṣabāḥ Fardī, born 4 June 1954), is an Algerian researcher, archaeologist, museum curator, and academic. Throughout her scientific career, she has specialized in Roman and early Christian and medieval art of North Africa, particularly focusing on the figure of Augustine of Hippo.

Additionally, she is the curator of the Tipasa museum and the Archaeological Museum of Cherchell. In her role as a curator, she was significantly involved in the protection and management of Algerian cultural heritage.

== Biography ==
Ferdi was born on 4 June 1954. She obtained a PhD in Classical antiquity from the University of Provence in 1982 and a diploma from the Pontifical Institute of Christian Archaeology in Rome. Between 1982 and 1985, she was appointed curator of the Tipasa museum and then of the Cherchell museum. Ferdi then took the position of head of the archaeological district of Tipasa until 2000. During this period, from 1995 to 2001, she served as the Secretary General of the Arab section of the International Council of Museums, an organization aimed at connecting museum curators from Arab countries.

Between 2001 and 2008, Ferdi served as a heritage inspector. In 2003, she spoke in Bordeaux at the study day titled "Saint Augustine: Numidia and the society of his time", where she presented the collaborative work she co-authored with Hélène Lafont-Couturier and Philippe Chauveau, Saint Augustine: A memory of Algeria. This work was described as "sumptuous" by Maurice Sznycer.

Since 2008, Ferdi has been a researcher for the National Center for Research in Archaeology (CNRA). In March 2013, she spoke at the EHESS in Paris to present on "the collections of mosaics in the archaeological museums of Algeria". In 2019, Ferdi organized a symposium dedicated to Augustine of Hippo.

As part of her activities as a curator, she is significantly involved in the protection of Algerian cultural heritage, notably by supporting projects aimed at connecting and developing Algerian cultural parks. Additionally, she co-directs the national corpus of mosaics of Algeria.
