= Minushahr =

City in Khuzestan province, Iran

Minushahr Persian: مینوشهر
- City
- Location within Iran
- Coordinates: 30°21′09″N 48°13′02″E
- Country: Iran
- Province: Khuzestan
- County: Khorramshahr
- District: Minu
- Established as a municipality: 1996

Population (2016)
  - Total: 2,231
- Time zone: UTC+3:30 (IRST)

Minushahr (Persian: مینوشهر) (Note: Also romanized as Mīnūshahr; formerly the village of Chumeh (چومه)) is a city in, and the capital of, Minu District of Khorramshahr County, Khuzestan province, Iran. It also serves as the administrative center for Jazireh-ye Minu Rural District.

== Demographics ==
=== Population ===
At the time of the 2006 National Census, the city's population was 1,210 in 249 households. The following census in 2011 counted 1,289 people in 334 households. The 2016 census measured the population of the city as 2,231 people in 628 households.
