= Archaeological Museum of Cherchell =

Coordinates: 36°36′30″N 2°11′28.5″E

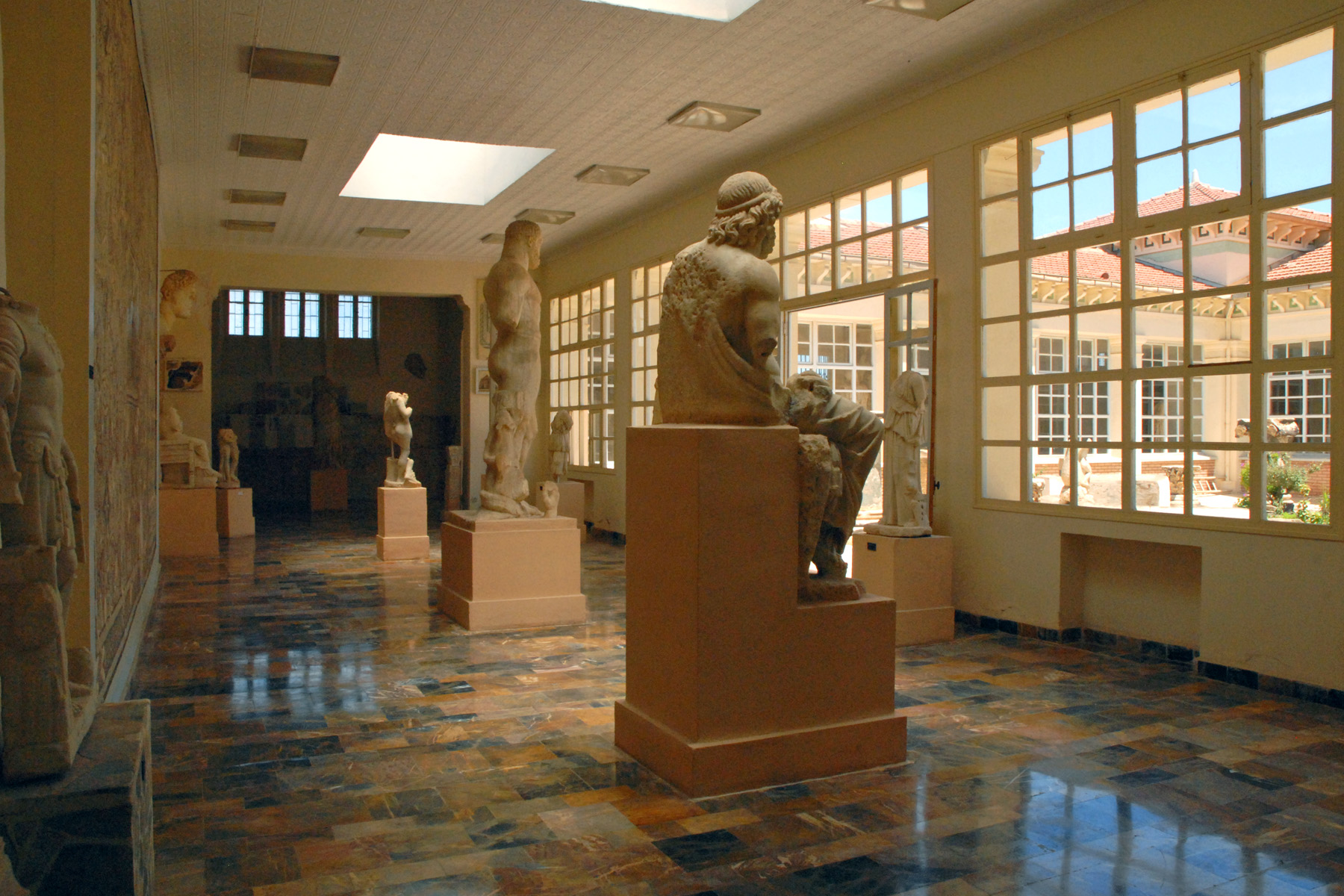
- Sculptures in the Museum of Cherchell
- Location: Tipaza Province, Algeria
- Type: archaeological museum
- Curator: Sabah Ferdi

The Archaeological Museum of Cherchell is an archaeological museum located in the center of the seaport town of Cherchell in Tipaza Province, Algeria.

== Characteristics ==
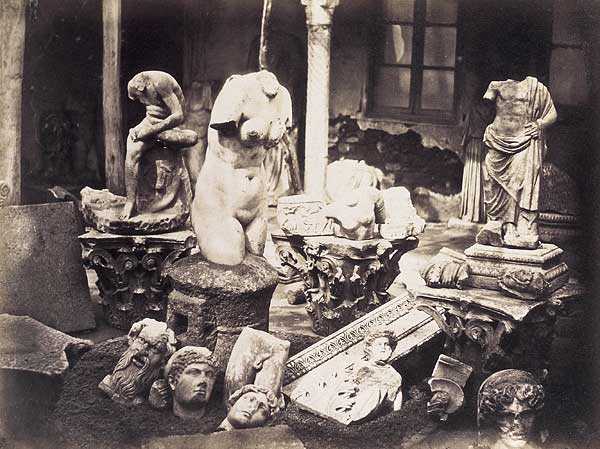
Fragments found during archaeological surveys, circa 1856.

The Cherchell Museum houses what are widely considered to be some of the best examples of Roman and Greek antiquities on the African continent. Cherchell was called Caesarea of Mauretania during the Roman Empire, and was the rich capital of Roman Mauretania Caesariensis. Many artifacts from these various periods of Cherchell's former history have been uncovered by archaeologists, a large number of which are on display in the Cherchell Archaeological Museum.

Exhibits include works by Byzantine silversmiths, such as ornately decorated patera (vessels used for drinking), as well as intricately designed mosaics. It was during the Roman reign over Mauritania in 25 BC, under the leadership of Juba II, that a theater, library and other buildings were established in Cherchell (Caesarea).

Juba II also gathered an impressive collection of artworks, particularly marble sculptures, some of which have landed up in museums in other parts of the world, but excellent examples are to be found in Cherchell Museum, along with a sculpture of the head of his wife, Cleopatra Selene II. Partial ruins of the Roman theater, Roman baths, and Civile Basilica are found on the outskirts of Cherchell.

== See also ==
- List of museums in Algeria
- Caesarea of Mauretania
- List of cultural assets of Algeria
