= Carthage Administration Inscription =

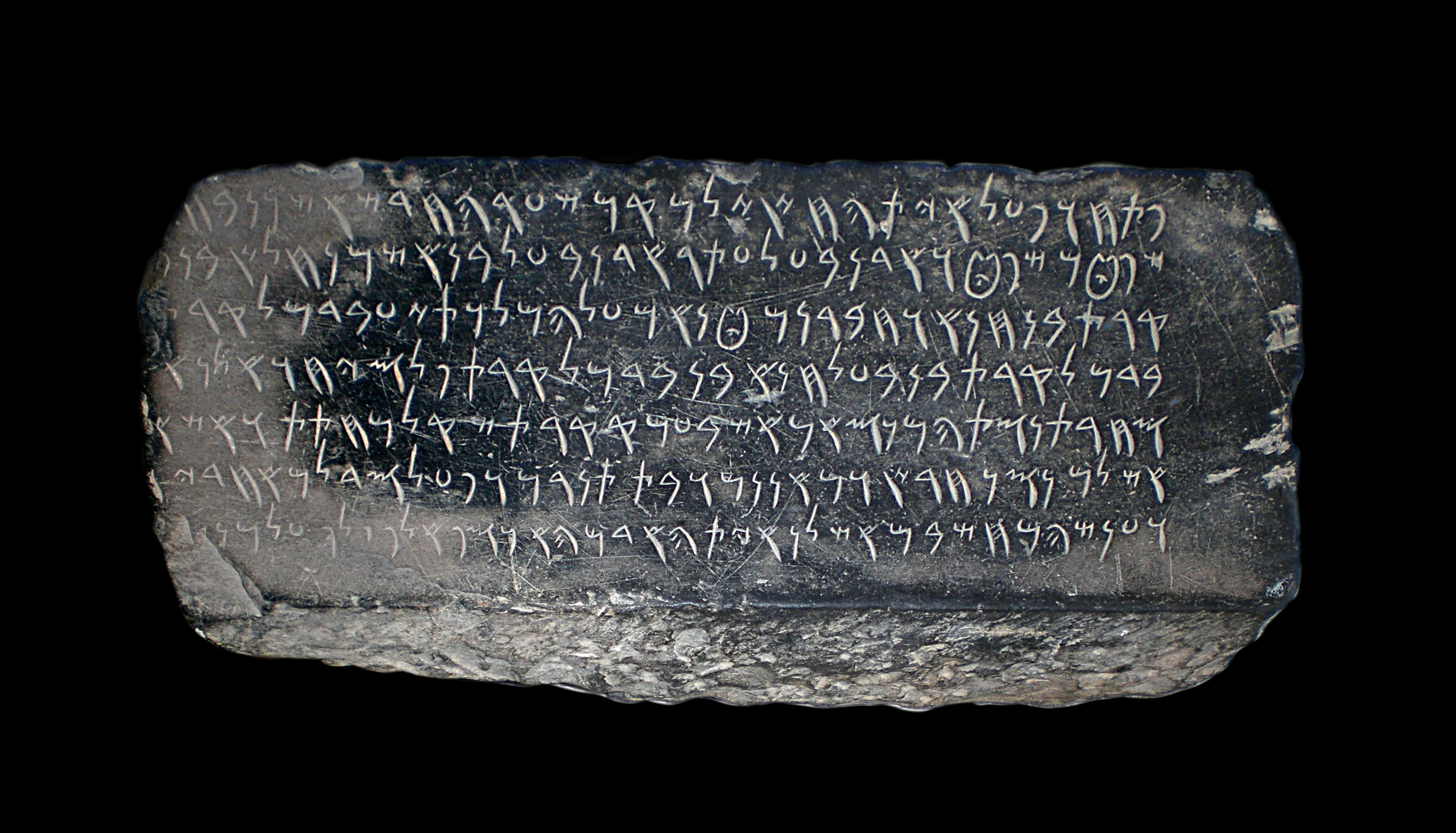
- Type: Stone Inscription
- Material: Marble or limestone
- Size: 25 cm × 11 cm (9.8 in × 4.3 in)
- Period/culture: 4th to 2nd century BCE
- Discovered: 1964; Carthage
- Present location: National Museum of Carthage
- Culture: Carthaginian

The Carthage Administration Inscription is an inscription in the Punic language, using the Phoenician alphabet, discovered on the archaeological site of Carthage in the 1960s and preserved in the National Museum of Carthage. It is known as KAI 303.

Found among elements of the Roman period, this inscription is key for the knowledge of the institutions and town planning of Carthage during the Punic period; it refers to magistrates and a sector of the population, corporations and craftsmen.

Its dating varies according to scholars, ranging from the fourth to the second century BC. The text describes works carried out in the city but their exact nature is not established with certainty because of the difficulty of reading the Phoenician language and the gaps in the document.

== Discovery ==
The inscription was discovered in 1964 during excavations led by Ammar Mahjoubi, about 100 m (330 ft) west of the TGM station in Carthage, and 300 m (980 ft) from the potters' quarter located in the current archaeological park of the Antonine Baths. It was mixed upon its discovery with rubble from a late Roman construction, "in a layer of embankments covering a 4th-century AD mosaic pavement", and has therefore not been found in situ.

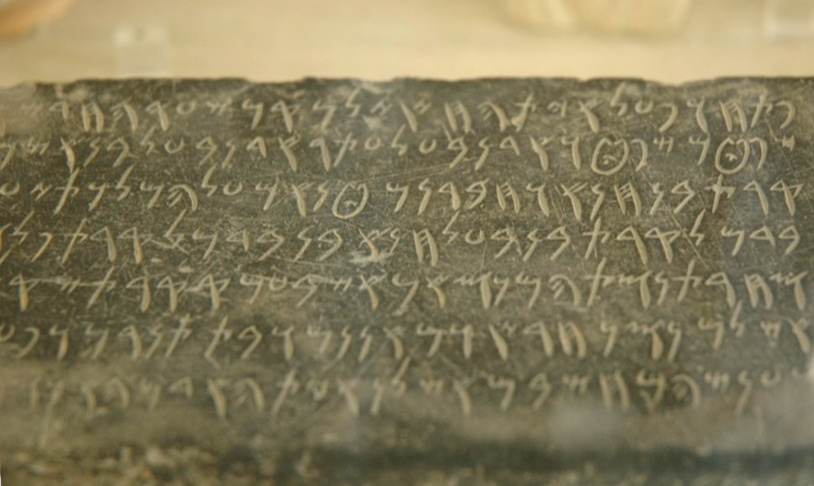
Close up of the inscription

== The inscription ==
1	ptḥ wpʿl ʾyt hḥṣ z lmqm šʿr hḥdš ʾš kn bḥ[mt drm ʿm qrtḥdšt bšt]	Opened and made was this street, in the direction of the place of the new door which is found on the wa[ll to the south, (by the) people of Carthage, in the year]
2	špṭm špṭ wʾdnbʿl ʿtr ʾdnbʿl bn ʾšmnḥlṣ bn b[...... w...... bn bdml-]	of the sufetes Šafat and Adonibaal, at the time of the magistracy^{?} of Adonibaal, son of Eshmunhilles, son of B[... and... son of Bodmel-]
3	-qrt bn ḥnʾ wḥbrnm ṭnʾm ʿl mmlkt z ʿbdmlqrt [bn ...... bn ... bʿl ḥrš]	-qart, son of Hanno, and his comrades. Assigned to this work are: Abd-Melqart [son of... son of... master craftsman;]
4	bdmlqrt bn bʿlḥnʾ bn bdmlqrt pls yhwʾln ʾ(ḥ^{?}) [bdmlqrt ḥṣb wʿml by kl]	Bodmelqart, son of Baalhanno, son of Bodmelqart, leveler; Yaḥaw'ilon, brother^{?} of [Bodmelqart, stonecutter; and for this worked all]
5	sḥrt nst hmksʾm ʾš bʿmq qrt šql mḥtt wʾš ʾ(y^{?})[ ksp wʾy ḥrṣ lm wʾp]	merchants, porters, the packers that are in the plain of the city, shekel-weighers and (those) that ha[ve^{?} no money, nor gold, and also (those)]
6	ʾš lm nsk ḥrṣ wmʾnnm wbt tnrm wpʿl sdlm ʾhdy (w^{?})[ʾm ymḥ ʾš ʾyt hspr z]	that have (money and gold), the gold founders, the vase artisans, and those of the kiln workshops, and the sandal makers, together. And^{?} [if someone erases this inscription]
7	wʿnš hmḥšbm ʾš ln ʾyt hʾdm hʾ ksp ʾlp|lp ʿl mn(m^{?}) [X bmḥr hspr].	our accountants will punish that man with a fine of 1,000 (shekels) of silver, also mina(s^{?}) [X, for the price of the inscription.]

Dupont-Sommer distinguishes four parts in the inscription: the first concerns the evocation of the works that took place in the Punic city. The second is the enumeration of the conductors of these municipal works. In the third sentence are cited various trades involved in the work undertaken. Finally, the listing ends with a threat against anyone who would harm the listing.

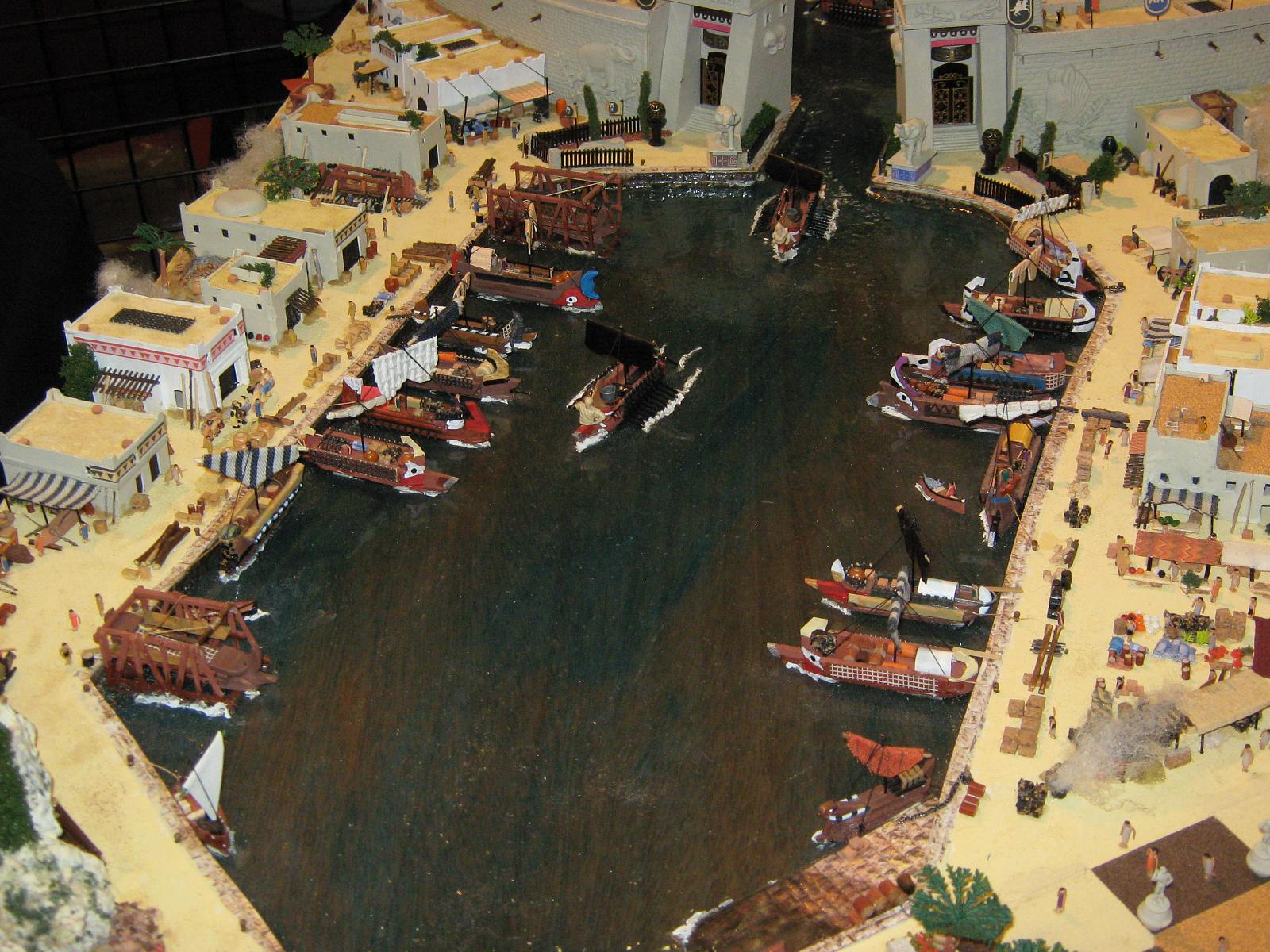
Model of the merchant port of Carthage, development probably dating from the second half of the 3rd century BC. J.-C.

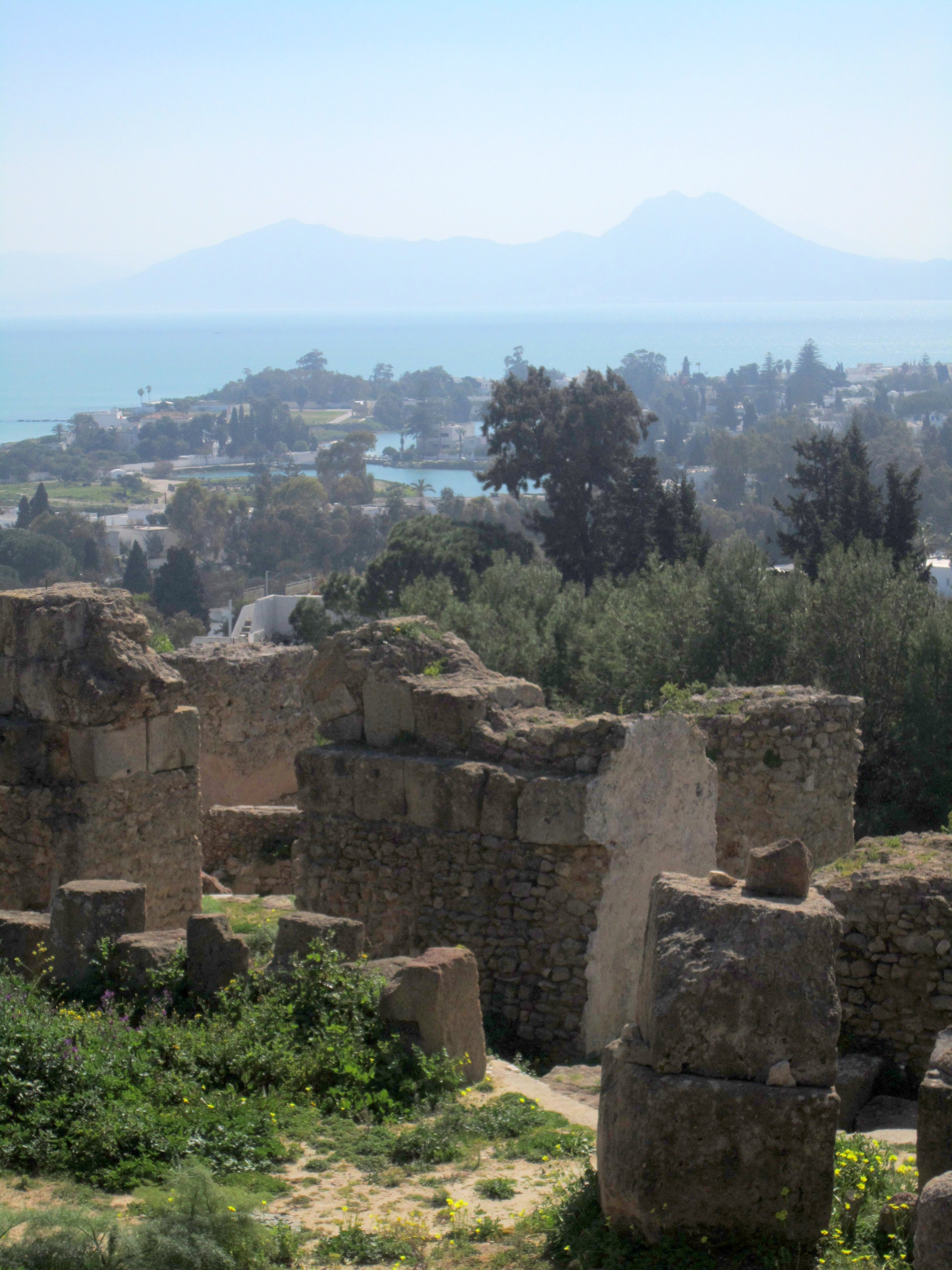
View of the plain of Carthage and the area of the Punic ports from the hill of Byrsa, with the Bou Kournine in the distance.

== Bibliography ==
=== General overview ===
- Beschaouch, Azedine (2001). La légende de Carthage. Archéologie (in French). Paris: Éditions Gallimard. p. 176. ISBN 2-07-053212-7.
- Lipinski, Edward (1992). Dictionnaire de la civilisation phénicienne et punique (in French). Turnhout: Brepols. p. 502. ISBN 2-503-50033-1.
- Slim, Hédi; Fauqué, Nicolas (2001). La Tunisie antique. De Hannibal à saint Augustin (in French). Paris: Mengès. p. 259. ISBN 2-85620-421-X.
- Slim, Hédi; Mahjoubi, Ammar; Belkhodja, Khaled; Ennabli, Abdelmajid (2003). Histoire générale de la Tunisie (in French). Vol. I « L'Antiquité ». Paris: Maisonneuve et Larose. p. 460. ISBN 2-7068-1695-3.
- Sznycer, Maurice (1968–1969). "La littérature punique". Archéologie vivante (in French). 1 (2): 141–148.
- Collectif (1995). Carthage (in French). Paris: Association française d'action artistique. ISBN 9973-22-026-9.
- Collectif (1992). Pour sauver Carthage (in French). Paris/Tunis: Unesco/INAA. p. 251. ISBN 92-3-202782-8.

==== Works on Carthaginian Punic ====
- Amadasi Guzzo, Maria Giulia (2007). Carthage (in French). Paris: Presses universitaires de France. p. 127. ISBN 978-2-13-053962-9.
- Dridi, Hédi (2006). Carthage et le monde punique (in French). Paris: Les Belles Lettres. p. 287. ISBN 2-251-41033-3.
- Ennabli, Abdelmajid; Slim, Hédi (1993). Carthage (in French). Tunis: Cérès. ISBN 9973-700-83-X.
- Fantar, M'hamed Hassine (1998). Carthage. Approche d'une civilisation (in French). Tunis: Alif. ISBN 9973-22-019-6.
- Fantar, M'hamed Hassine (2007). Carthage (in French). Tunis: Cérès. p. 127. ISBN 978-9973-22-019-6.
- Fantar, M'hamed Hassine (1995). "Architecture punique en Tunisie". Dossiers d'archéologie (in French) (200): 6–17.
- Lancel, Serge (1992). Carthage (in French). Paris: Fayard. ISBN 2-213-02838-9.
- Maurice Sznycer, « Carthage et la civilisation punique », dans Claude Nicolet, Rome et la conquête du monde méditerranéen, vol. 2 : Genèse d'un empire, Paris, Presses universitaires de France, 2001, p. 545-593
- Sznycer, Maurice (2002). "Nouvelles observations sur le fonctionnement du " marché " et sur certains mécanismes de la vie économique à Carthage d'après les témoignages épigraphiques". Antiquités africaines (in French). 38–39: 325–330. doi:10.3406/antaf.2002.1370.
- Tlatli, Salah-Eddine (1978). La Carthage punique. Étude urbaine : la ville, ses fonctions, son rayonnement (in French). Paris: Adrien-Maisonneuve.

=== Inscription specific ===
- Dupont-Sommer, André (1968). "Une nouvelle inscription punique de Carthage". CRAI (in French). 112 (1): 116–133. doi:10.3406/crai.1968.12226.
- Mahjoubi, Ammar; Fantar, M'hamed Hassine (July–December 1966). "Une nouvelle inscription carthaginoise". Comptes-rendus de l'Accademia Nazionale dei Lincei [Rendiconti della Classe di Scienze morali, storiche e filologiche]. VIII (in French). XXI, fasc. 7-12: 201–210.
- Sznycer, Maurice (1967–1968). "Sur une nouvelle inscription punique de Carthage". Comptes-rendus du Groupe linguistique d'études chamito-sémitiques (in French). XII: 5–6.
