= Shahrak-e Mamlah =

Shahrak-e Mamlah شهرك مملح
- Village
- Location within Iran
- Coordinates: 32°26′28″N 47°50′49″E
- Country: Iran
- Province: Ilam
- County: Dehloran
- Bakhsh: Musian
- Rural District: Dasht-e Abbas

Population (2006)
  - Total: 456
- Time zone: UTC+3:30 (IRST)
  - Summer (DST): UTC+4:30 (IRDT)

Shahrak-e Mamlah (Persian: شهرك مملح, also Romanized as Shahrak-e Mamlaḩ; also known as Mamlaḩ) is a village in Dasht-e Abbas Rural District, Musian District, Dehloran County, Ilam Province, Iran. At the 2006 census, its population was 456, in 74 families. The village is populated by Arabs.
