= Mortezi Rahmani =

Morteza Rahmani مرتضي رحماني
- Village
- Location within Iran
- Coordinates: 33°23′40″N 59°16′29″E
- Country: Iran
- Province: South Khorasan
- County: Qaen
- Bakhsh: Sedeh
- Rural District: Sedeh

Population (2006)
  - Total: 119
- Time zone: UTC+3:30 (IRST)
  - Summer (DST): UTC+4:30 (IRDT)

Morteza Rahmani (Persian: مرتضي رحماني, also Romanized as Mortezā Raḩmānī; also known as Kalāteh-ye Raḩmānī, Kalāteh-ye Mortāza, Kalāteh-ye Morteẕā, and Raḩmānī') is a village in Sedeh Rural District, Sedeh District, Qaen County, South Khorasan Province, Iran. At the 2006 census, its population was 119, in 42 families.
