= Fortress Re =

Fortress Re Inc.
- Industry: Aviation Reinsurance
- Headquarters: Burlington, North Carolina
- Key people: Maurice Sabbah; Kenneth Kornfeld

Fortress Re Inc. was an American aviation reinsurance company based in Burlington, North Carolina, and co-owned by Maurice Sabbah. Their auditor was Deloitte & Touche.

== History ==
In 1979, Maurice Sabbah and Kenneth Kornfeld bought the reinsurance company Fortress Reinsurance Co. where they worked since 1972, and paid off the debt of the purchase ($700,000) in 3 years. Sabbah's family was the larger shareholder with two-thirds of the company's shares.

During the 1970s and 1980s, Fortress Re greatly expanded its activities in Japan providing reinsurance solutions to Japanese insurance funds. Fortress Reinsurance Co. created a Bermuda-based subsidiary in 1984, Carolina Re, that collected the large dividends the owners collected discreetly. The Bermuda authorities declared Carolina Re bankrupt on 3 December 2001.

A November 2001 Insurance Journal article stated that the Japanese insurance companies Taisei, Nissan Fire & Marine Insurance Co. and Aioi Insurance Co were the owners of Fortress Reinsurance Co.

=== 9/11 financial failure ===
The agency was dealt a heavy blow by the September 11 attacks. Fortress Re pooled the funds of several insurance companies to share the risks of reinsuring aviation portfolios. All four planes that crashed on September 11, 2001, were ultimately reinsured into the Fortress Re pool. The participating companies faced claims of $2.5 billion, and the company's funds fell far short. Other airline disasters followed, including a passenger jet crash in the New York City borough of Queens on November 12, 2001. Fortress Re stopped writing new business at this time, and has not recommenced. The Bermuda authorities declared Carolina Re bankrupt on 3 December 2001.

Legal actions began from a number of Japanese insurance companies at the start of 2002 towards the directors of Fortress Re, alleging the company had misrepresented losses and performed other improper acts, including Sabbah and his partner "amassing personal fortunes" by skimming money off the top from Sompo's funds. Sabbah denied any wrongdoing.

In 2004, the two directors of Fortress Re were collectively forced to pay $1.12 billion by a court in New York, for defrauding Sompo Japan Insurance.

In July 2004, a $400 million settlement was agreed between the parties.

Maurice Sabbah founded the American Hebrew Academy in Greensboro, North Carolina, without disclosing his name as the founder and major donor. Japanese insurers who were covered by Fortress Re reached an agreement in their effort to recover some of their losses by suits against the Hebrew Academy. The specifics in regard to the settlement remain undisclosed.

Sabbah died in April 2006.
