= Kafisheh, Shadegan =

Kafisheh كفيشه
- Village
- Location within Iran
- Coordinates: 30°45′50″N 48°38′02″E
- Country: Iran
- Province: Khuzestan
- County: Shadegan
- Bakhsh: Central
- Rural District: Jaffal

Population (2006)
  - Total: 152
- Time zone: UTC+3:30 (IRST)
  - Summer (DST): UTC+4:30 (IRDT)

Kafisheh (Persian: كفيشه, also Romanized as Kafīsheh and Kofeysheh) is a village in Jaffal Rural District, in the Central District of Shadegan County, Khuzestan Province, Iran. At the 2006 census, its population was 152, in 22 families.
