= Mohanna, Ramhormoz =

Mohanna مهنا
- Village
- Location within Iran
- Coordinates: 31°12′43″N 49°38′13″E
- Country: Iran
- Province: Khuzestan
- County: Ramhormoz
- Bakhsh: Central
- Rural District: Howmeh-ye Sharqi

Population (2006)
  - Total: 42
- Time zone: UTC+3:30 (IRST)
  - Summer (DST): UTC+4:30 (IRDT)

Mohanna (Persian: مهنا, also romanized as Mohannā) is a village in Howmeh-ye Sharqi Rural District, in the Central District of Ramhormoz County, Khuzestan Province, Iran. At the 2006 census its population was 42, in 7 qfamilies.
