= Naimiyeh, Syria =

Naimiyeh النعيمية Nu'aymiyah
- Village
- Location in Syria
- Coordinates: 35.058837°N 37.489854°E
- Country: Syria
- Governorate: Hama
- District: Salamiyah
- Subdistrict: Uqayribat

Population (2004)
  - Total: 1,226
- Time zone: UTC+3 (AST)
- City Qrya Pcode: C3330

Naimiyeh (Arabic: النعيمية, romanized: Naʿimiya) is a village in central Syria, administratively part of the Uqayribat Subdistrict of the Salamiyah District of Hama Governorate. It is located east of Salamiyah, 3 kilometers (1.9 mi) from Uqayribat and about 45 kilometers (28 mi) east of Hama.

According to the Syria Central Bureau of Statistics (CBS), Naimiyeh had a population of 1,226 in the 2004 census. The municipality of Naimiyeh was established in 2006. Its territory extends to the Jabal al-Balaas highland and incorporates eleven other villages, including al-Khadra. The population of the municipality was about 6,000 in 2009.
