= Arazeh =

Arazeh عراضه
- Village
- Location within Iran
- Coordinates: 30°03′45″N 48°28′20″E
- Country: Iran
- Province: Khuzestan
- County: Abadan
- Bakhsh: Arvandkenar
- Rural District: Nasar

Population (2006)
  - Total: 143
- Time zone: UTC+3:30 (IRST)
  - Summer (DST): UTC+4:30 (IRDT)

Arazeh (Persian: عراضه, also Romanized as ‘Arāẕeh; also known as Qaşabeh, Qasbat an Nassār, Qoşbeh-ye Naşşār, and Qoşbeh-ye Nesār) is a village in Nasar Rural District, Arvandkenar District, Abadan County, Khuzestan Province, Iran. At the 2006 census, its population was 143, in 27 families.
