= Maurice Sznycer =

French historian (1921–2010)

Maurice Sznycer (1921 in Poland – 29 July 2010 in Paris) was a French historian, philologist, archaeologist, epigrapher and specialist of the Semitic world.

His work focused as much on near East world as on ancient Carthage.

He lived as a Partisan during the 1940s, along with his brother, Selim.

After he was elected "directeur d'études" at the École pratique des hautes études (IVth section), he published in the 1970s several reference books and articles devoted to the Phoenicians in Cyprus, the Phoenician-Punic expansion in the western Mediterranean or Phoenician toponyms in the Western Mediterranean.
