= Shophet =

Community leader of significant civic status In several ancient Semitic-speaking cultures

In several ancient Semitic-speaking cultures and associated historical regions, the shopheṭ or shofeṭ (plural shophetim or shofetim; Hebrew: שׁוֹפֵט, romanized: šōp̄ēṭ, Phoenician: 𐤔𐤐𐤈, romanized: šōfēṭ, Punic: 𐤔𐤐𐤈, romanized: šūfeṭ, the last loaned into Latin as sūfes; see also Ugaritic: 𐎘𐎔𐎉, romanized: ṯāpiṭ) was a community leader of significant civic stature, often functioning as a chief magistrate with authority roughly equivalent to Roman consular powers.

== Etymology ==
In Hebrew and several other Semitic languages, shopheṭ literally means "Judge", from the Semitic root Š-P-Ṭ, "to pass judgment". Cognate titles exist in other Semitic cultures, notably Phoenicia.

== Hebrew ==
In the Book of Judges in the Hebrew Bible, the shofṭim were chieftains who united various Israelite tribes in time of mutual danger to defeat foreign enemies.

== Phoenician ==
In the various independent Phoenician city-states—on the coasts of present-day Lebanon and western Syria, the Punic colonies on the Mediterranean Sea, and in Carthage itself—the šūfeṭ, called in Latin a sūfes, was a non-royal magistrate granted control over a city-state, sometimes functioning much in the same way as a Roman consul. For example, both offices served a one-year term in pairs of two.

The officeholder's role as a diplomatic executive, representative of a collective citizenry, is evidenced by an inscription written by the šūfeṭ Diomitus at Sidon in the late third century BC. He boasts of his chariot race victory at the Nemean Games in Greece, perpetuating political favor as "the first of the citizens" to do so.

== Punic ==
By the time of the Punic Wars, the government of Ancient Carthage was headed by a pair of annually elected sufetes. Livy's account of the Punic Wars affords a list of the procedural responsibilities of the Carthaginian sufet, including the convocation and presidency of the senate, the submission of business to the People's Assembly, and service as trial judges. Their number, term, and powers are therefore similar to those of the Roman consuls, with the notable difference that Roman consuls were also commanders-in-chief of the Roman military, a power apparently denied to the sufetes.

The term sufet was not, however, reserved for the heads of the Carthaginian state. Towards the end of their Western Mediterranean dominance, political coordination between local and colonial Carthaginians was likely expressed through a regional hierarchy of sufetes. For example, some epigraphic evidence from Punic-era Sardinia is dated with four names: the years' magistrates not only on the island, but also at home in North Africa.

Further inscriptional evidence of sufetes found in the major settlements of Roman Sardinia indicates that the office, having endured there for three centuries under Carthaginian sovereignty, was utilized by the descendants of Punic settlers to refuse both cultural and political assimilation with their mainland Italian conquerors. Punic-style magistracies appear epigraphically unattested only by the end of the first century BCE, although two sufetes wielded power in Bithia as late as the mid-second century CE.

== Later use ==
Official state terminology of the late Republic and Roman Empire repurposed the word sufet to refer to Roman-style local magistrates serving in Africa Proconsularis, although a sufet appears as far-flung as Volubilis in modern-day Morocco. The institution is attested in more than forty post-Carthaginian cities, ranging from the Third Punic War to the second century CE reign of Commodus. Settlements governed by sufetes included Althiburos, Calama, Capsa, Cirta, Gadiaufala, Gales, Limisa, Mactar, Thugga, and Volubilis.

Unlike the continuity of Punic inhabitance in Sardinia, the sufet's prevalence in interior regions of Roman Africa, which were previously unsettled by Carthage, suggests that settlers and Punic refugees endeared themselves to Roman authorities by adopting a readily intelligible government.

Three sufetes serving simultaneously appear in first century CE records at Althiburos, Mactar, and Thugga, reflecting a choice to adopt Punic nomenclature for Romanized institutions without the actual, traditionally balanced magistracy. In those cases, a third, non-annual position of tribal or communal chieftain marked an inflection point in the assimilation of external African groups into the Roman political fold.

The Roman approximation of the term, sufes, appears in at least six works of Latin literature. Erroneous references to Carthaginian "kings" with the Latin term rex betray the translations of Roman authors from Greek sources, who equated the sufet with the more monarchical basileus (Greek: βασιλεύς).

== See also ==
- Hakham
- Zemene Mesafint
- Bomilcar (suffete)
