= Howmeh-ye Gharbi Rural District (Khorramshahr County) =

Rural district in Khuzestan province, Iran

Howmeh-ye Gharbi Rural District Persian: دهستان حومه غربي
- Rural District
- Location within Iran
- Coordinates: 30°41′49″N 48°07′44″E
- Country: Iran
- Province: Khuzestan
- County: Khorramshahr
- District: Central
- Capital: Pol-e Now

Population (2016)
  - Total: 12,682
- Time zone: UTC+3:30 (IRST)

Howmeh-ye Gharbi Rural District (Persian: دهستان حومه غربي) is in the Central District of Khorramshahr County, Khuzestan province, Iran. Its capital is the village of Pol-e Now.

== Demographics ==
=== Population ===
At the time of the 2006 National Census, the rural district's population was 10,567 in 2,176 households. There were 11,632 inhabitants in 2,886 households at the following census of 2011. The 2016 census measured the population of the rural district as 12,682 in 2,498 households. The most populous of its 39 villages was Sowreh, with 3,355 people.
