= Howmeh-ye Sharqi Rural District (Khorramshahr County) =

Rural district in Khuzestan province, Iran

Howmeh-ye Sharqi Rural District Persian: دهستان حومه شرقي
- Rural District
- Location within Iran
- Coordinates: 30°28′31″N 48°15′51″E
- Country: Iran
- Province: Khuzestan
- County: Khorramshahr
- District: Central
- Capital: Haffar-e Sharqi

Population (2016)
  - Total: 10,267
- Time zone: UTC+3:30 (IRST)

Howmeh-ye Sharqi Rural District (Persian: دهستان حومه شرقي) is in the Central District of Khorramshahr County, Khuzestan province, Iran. Its capital is the village of Haffar-e Sharqi.

== Demographics ==
=== Population ===
At the time of the 2006 National Census, the rural district's population was 8,388 in 1,594 households. There were 9,721 inhabitants in 2,506 households at the following census of 2011. The 2016 census measured the population of the rural district as 10,267 in 2,825 households. The most populous of its 31 villages was Moammareh, with 2,747 people.
