= Gharb-e Karun Rural District =

Rural district in Khuzestan province, Iran

Gharb-e Karun Rural District Persian: دهستان غرب كارون
- Rural District
- Location within Iran
- Coordinates: 30°45′48″N 48°20′10″E
- Country: Iran
- Province: Khuzestan
- County: Khorramshahr
- District: Central
- Capital: Kofeysheh

Population (2016)
  - Total: 5,774
- Time zone: UTC+3:30 (IRST)

Gharb-e Karun Rural District (Persian: دهستان غرب كارون) is in the Central District of Khorramshahr County, Khuzestan province, Iran. Its capital is the village of Kofeysheh.

== Demographics ==
=== Population ===
At the time of the 2006 National Census, the rural district's population was 4,821 in 846 households. There were 4,663 inhabitants in 1,033 households at the following census of 2011. The 2016 census measured the population of the rural district as 5,774 in 1,382 households. The most populous of its 14 villages was Sabeh, with 980 people.
