= Jazireh-ye Minu Rural District =

Rural district in Khuzestan province, Iran

Jazireh-ye Minu Rural District Persian: دهستان جزيره مينو
- Rural District
- Location within Iran
- Coordinates: 30°20′33″N 48°13′00″E
- Country: Iran
- Province: Khuzestan
- County: Khorramshahr
- District: Minu
- Capital: Minushahr

Population (2016)
  - Total: 6,923
- Time zone: UTC+3:30 (IRST)

Jazireh-ye Minu Rural District (Persian: دهستان جزيره مينو) is in Minu District of Khorramshahr County, Khuzestan province, Iran. It is administered from the city of Minushahr. (Note: Formerly the village of Chumeh)

== Demographics ==
=== Population ===
At the time of the 2006 National Census, the rural district's population was 6,372 in 1,313 households. There were 6,978 inhabitants in 1,805 households at the following census of 2011. The 2016 census measured the population of the rural district as 6,923 in 1,921 households. The most populous of its 40 villages was Jabbar Abd ol Emam, with 1,086 people.
