= Minu District =

District in Khuzestan province, Iran

Minu District Persian: بخش مینو
- District
- Location within Iran
- Coordinates: 30°20′33″N 48°13′00″E
- Country: Iran
- Province: Khuzestan
- County: Khorramshahr
- Capital: Minushahr

Population (2016)
  - Total: 9,154
- Time zone: UTC+3:30 (IRST)

Minu District (Persian: بخش مینو) is in Khorramshahr County, Khuzestan province, Iran. Its capital is the city of Minushahr. (Note: Formerly the village of Chumeh)

== Demographics ==
=== Population ===
At the time of the 2006 National Census, the district's population was 7,582 in 1,562 households. The following census in 2011 counted 8,267 people in 2,139 households. The 2016 census measured the population of the district as 9,154 inhabitants in 2,549 households.

=== Administrative divisions ===
Minu District Population
Administrative Divisions	2006	2011	2016
Jazireh-ye Minu RD	6,372	6,978	6,923
Minushahr (city)	1,210	1,289	2,231
Total	7,582	8,267	9,154
RD = Rural District
