= Central District (Khorramshahr County) =

District in Khuzestan province, Iran

Central District (Khorramshahr County) Persian: بخش مرکزی شهرستان خرمشهر
- District
- Location within Iran
- Coordinates: 30°39′29″N 48°15′16″E
- Country: Iran
- Province: Khuzestan
- County: Khorramshahr
- Capital: Khorramshahr

Population (2016)
  - Total: 161,820
- Time zone: UTC+3:30 (IRST)

The Central District of Khorramshahr County (Persian: بخش مرکزی شهرستان خرمشهر) is in Khuzestan province, Iran. Its capital is the city of Khorramshahr.

== History ==
After the 2016 National Census, Kut-e Sheykh neighborhood of the city of Khorramshahr was elevated to city status as Moqavemat.

== Demographics ==
=== Population ===
At the time of the 2006 National Census, the district's population was 147,642 in 31,001 households. The following census in 2011 counted 155,434 people in 40,048 households. The 2016 census measured the population of the district as 161,820 inhabitants in 44,829 households.

=== Administrative divisions ===
Central District (Khorramshahr County) Population
Administrative Divisions	2006	2011	2016
Gharb-e Karun RD	4,821	4,663	5,774
Howmeh-ye Gharbi RD	10,567	11,632	12,682
Howmeh-ye Sharqi RD	8,388	9,721	10,267
Khorramshahr (city)	123,866	129,418	133,097
Moqavemat (city) (Note: Formerly Kut-e Sheykh neighborhood in the city of Khorramshahr; became a city after the 2016 census)			
Total	147,642	155,434	161,820
RD = Rural District
