= Khorramshahr County =

County in Khuzestan province, Iran

Khorramshahr County Persian: شهرستان خرمشهر
- County
- Location of Khorramshahr County in Khuzestan province (bottom left, pink)

- Location of Khuzestan province in Iran
- Coordinates: 30°39′N 48°15′E
- Country: Iran
- Province: Khuzestan
- Capital: Khorramshahr
- Districts: Central, Minu

Population (2016)
  - Total: 170,976
- Time zone: UTC+3:30 (IRST)

Khorramshahr County (Persian: شهرستان خرمشهر) (Note: Also known in Arabic as Al-Muhammarah (Arabic: المحمرة)) is in Khuzestan province, Iran. Its capital is the city of Khorramshahr.

== History ==
After the 2016 National Census, Kut-e Sheykh neighborhood of the city of Khorramshahr was elevated to city status as Moqavemat.

== Demographics ==
=== Population ===
At the time of the 2006 census, the county's population was 155,224 in 32,563 households. The following census in 2011 counted 163,701 people in 42,171 households. The 2016 census measured the population of the county as 170,976 in 47,380 households.

=== Administrative divisions ===
Khorramshahr County's population history and administrative structure over three consecutive censuses are shown in the following table.

Khorramshahr County Population
Administrative Divisions	2006	2011	2016
Central District	147,642	155,434	161,820
Gharb-e Karun RD	4,821	4,663	5,774
Howmeh-ye Gharbi RD	10,567	11,632	12,682
Howmeh-ye Sharqi RD	8,388	9,721	10,267
Khorramshahr (city)	123,866	129,418	133,097
Moqavemat (city) (Note: Formerly Kut-e Sheykh neighborhood in the city of Khorramshahr; became a city after the 2016 census)			
Minu District	7,582	8,267	9,154
Jazireh-ye Minu RD	6,372	6,978	6,923
Minushahr (city) (Note: Formerly the village of Chumeh)	1,210	1,289	2,231
Total	155,224	163,701	170,976
RD = Rural District

== See also ==
Media related to Khorramshahr County at Wikimedia Commons
