= List of Carthaginians =

This an alphabetical List of ancient Carthaginians. These include all citizens of ancient Carthage remembered in history, before the final Roman destruction of the state.

Note that some persons may be listed multiple times, once for each part of the name.

== B ==
- Bomilcar — commander in the First Punic War
- Bomilcar — suffete and commander in the Second Punic War
- Bomilcar — commander in the Second Punic War
- Bodo — senator and naval commander
- Bostar (Punic: 𐤁𐤃𐤏𐤔𐤕𐤓𐤕, BDʿŠTRT, "Servant of Ashtart"; Ancient Greek: Βώσταρ, Bṓstar) — commander who foolishly gave away the hostages held at Saguntum
- Bostar — ambassador sent by Hannibal to Philip V of Macedon in 215 BCE
- Bostar — governor of Capua with Hanno in 211 BCE

== C ==
- Carthalo (fl. 209 BC) — commander
- Clitomachus (born Hasdrubal) — philosopher

== D ==
- Dido — according to ancient Greek and Roman sources the founder and first queen of Carthage

== G ==
- Gisco of Carthage
- Gisgo (son of Hanno I) — son of Hanno I the Great, general
- Gisgo (battle of Cannae) — noted officer before the Battle of Cannae

== H ==
- Hamilcar I of Carthage (r. 510–480 BCE) — king
- Hamilcar II of Carthage
- Hamilcar, son of Hanno — commander at the Battle of Himera in 480 BC during the First Sicilian War
- Hamilcar — Punic strategus against Timoleon of Syracuse
- Hamilcar — brother of Gisco (3) and possibly brother of Hanno (9) with whom he was executed in the middle of the 4th century BC (Polyen. Strat. V 11)
- Hamilcar the Rhodian — possibly Carthaginian spy in the entourage of Alexander the Great, executed when returning to Carthage
- Hamilcar, son of Gisgo and grandson to Hanno the Great (d. 309 BC) — commander in the Third Sicilian War, captured during the Siege of Syracuse and then killed in 309 BC
- Hamilcar — strategus during the First Punic War. Not identical with the homonym officer mentioned by Diod. XXIV 12. ELip
- Hamilcar — commander during the First Punic War
- Hamilcar Barca (c. 270–228 BC) — general during and after the First Punic War (264–241 BC). Father of Hannibal of the Second Punic War
- Hannibal (247–183/182 BC) — general who fought the Roman Republic in the Second Punic War
- Hannibal Mago (died 406 BC) — shofet (magistrate) of Carthage in 410 BC
- Hannibal Gisco (died 258 BC) — military commander in the First Punic War
- Hannibal the Rhodian — ship captain during the siege of Lilybaeum in the First Punic War
- Hannibal (Mercenary War) (died 238 BC) — general
- Hannibal Monomachus — fought alongside the famous Hannibal
- Hanno the Elder (died 204 BC) — Carthaginian general
- Hanno I the Great (4th century BC) — Carthaginian politician and military leader
- Hanno II the Great (3rd century BC) — wealthy Carthaginian aristocrat
- Hanno III the Great (2nd century BC) — ultra-conservative Carthaginian politician
- Hanno the Navigator — Carthaginian explorer
- Hanno, son of Hannibal — Carthaginian general in the First Punic War
- Hanno, Messana garrison commander — Carthaginian general in The First Punic War
- Hanno, son of Bomilcar — Carthaginian officer in the Second Punic War
- Hasdrubal I of Carthage — Magonid king of Ancient Carthage 530–510 BC
- Hasdrubal the Fair (c. 270 BC – 221 BC), son-in-law of Hamilcar Barca
- Hasdrubal Barca (245–207 BC), son of Hamilcar Barca and brother of Hannibal and Mago
- Hasdrubal Gisco Gisgonis (died 202 BC), another commander in the Second Punic War, father of Sophonisba
- Hasdrubal the Bald — general in the Second Punic War
- Hasdrubal the Boetharch — general of Punic forces in the Third Punic War c. 146 BC
- Hasdrubal (quartermaster) — officer in the Second Punic War c. 218 BC
- Hasdrubal (187/6–110/09 BC; later Clitomachus) — philosopher (187/6–110/09 BC)
- Himilco — navigator and explorer who lived during the height of Carthaginian power in the late 6th century BC
- Himilco (general)
- Himilco (fl. 3rd century BC) - general in Sicily during the Second Punic War.

== M ==
- Mago I of Carthage
- Mago II of Carthage
- Mago III of Carthage
- Mago Barca
- Mago (fleet commander) — commander of the Carthaginian fleet under Himilco in the war against Dionysius I of Syracuse, 396 BCE
- Mago (general) — commander of the Carthaginian fleet and army in Sicily in 344 BC
- Mago (agricultural writer) — writer and author of an agricultural manual in Punic
- Malchus I (c. 556–550 BC) — king

== P ==
- Phameas - Carthaginian cavalry officer in the Third Punic War

== S ==
- Sophonisba — noblewoman, daughter of Hasdrubal Gisco Gisgonis (son of Gisco), poisoned herself to avoid humiliation in a Roman triumph

== See also ==
- List of monarchs of Carthage
- List of patriarchs, archbishops and bishops of Carthage
- Politics of Ancient Carthage

== Literature ==
- Geus, Klaus (1994). Prosopographie der literarisch bezeugten Karthager. Peeters Publishers. ISBN 9789068316438.
- Benz, Frank L. (1972). Personal Names in the Phoenician and Punic Inscriptions: A Catalog, Grammatical Study and Glossary of Elements. Biblical institute Press. ISBN 9788876534270.
