= List of monarchs of Carthage =

Until 308 BC Carthage was ruled, at least officially, by monarchs, in the sense of the word that executive power was held by one person. It also seems for the time period below to have been passed down in the clan of the Magonids. The title itself was most likely Suffete.

Didoniens

- Dido c.814 - c. 760 BC
- Unknown c.760 - c. 580 BC
- Hanno I c. 580 – c. 556 BC
- Malchus c. 556 – c. 550 BC

Magonids

- Mago I c. 550 – c. 530 BC
- Hasdrubal I c. 530 – c. 510 BC
- Hamilcar I c. 510–480 BC
- Hanno II 480–440 BC
- Himilco I (in Sicily) 460–410 BC
- Hannibal I 440–406 BC
- Himilco II 406–396 BC
- Mago II 396–375 BC
- Mago III 375–344 BC
- Hanno III 344–340 BC

Hannonids

- Hanno I 340–337 BC
- Gisco 337–330 BC
- Hamilcar II 330–309 BC
- Bomilcar 309–308 BC

In 480 BC, following Hamilcar I's death, the king lost most of his power to an aristocratic Council of Elders. In 308 BC, Bomilcar attempted a coup to restore the monarch to full power, but failed, which led to Carthage becoming a republic.
