= Phoenician and Punic Sardinia =

Aspect of Mediterranean history

The history of Phoenician and Punic Sardinia deals with two different historical periods between the 9th century BC and the 3rd century BC concerning the peaceful arrival on the island of the first Phoenician merchants and their integration into the Nuragic civilization by bringing new knowledge and technologies, and the subsequent Carthaginian (Punic) presence aimed at exploiting mineral resources of the Iglesiente and controlling the fertile plains of the Campidano.

== The Phoenicians ==
=== First Phoenician presences in Sardinia ===
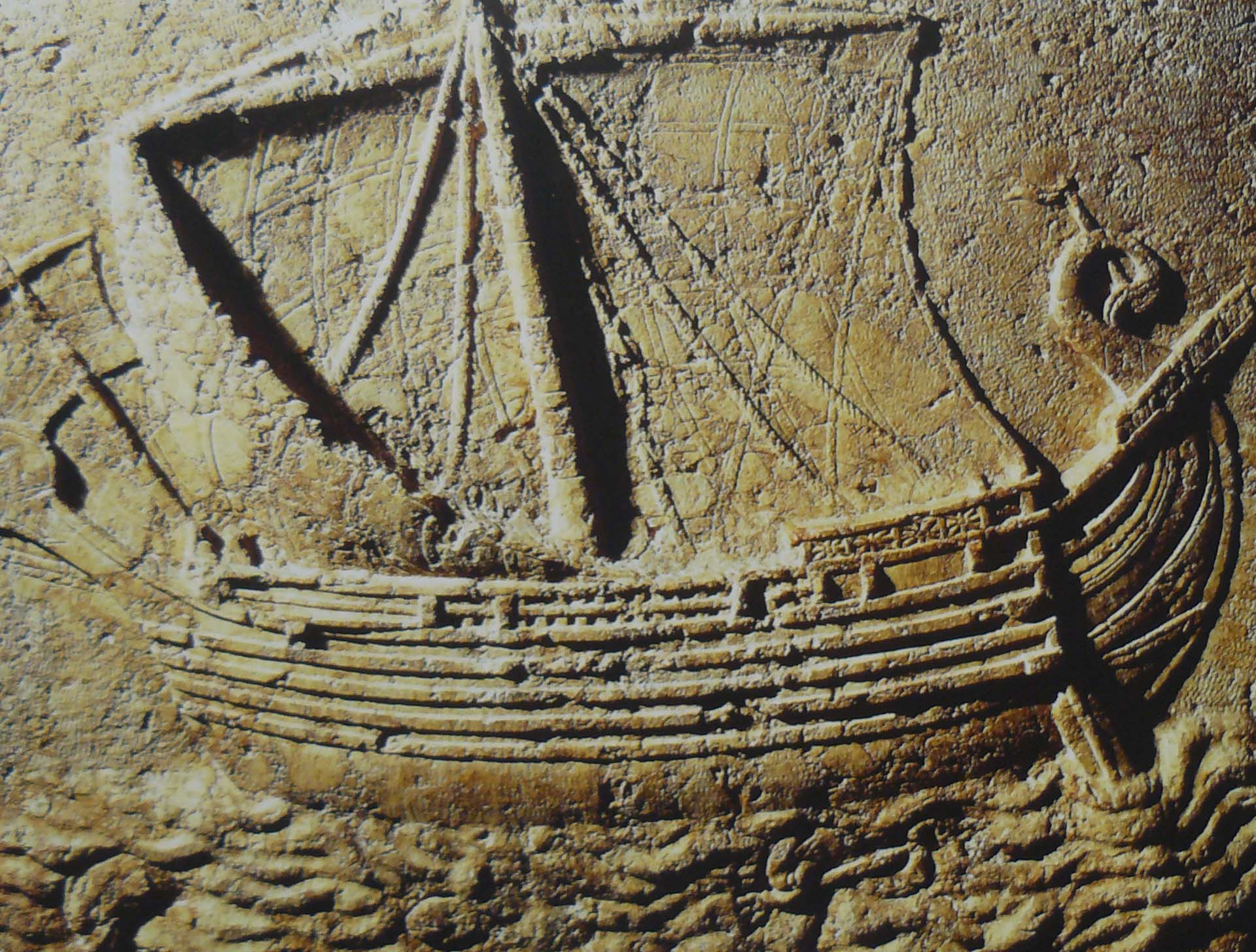
Phoenician ship (from the Ship sarcophagus)

During the 9th and 8th centuries BC there is news of their presence along the coasts of Sardinia. According to the most recent researches, the coastal Nuragic villages located in the southern and western coast of the island were the first points of contact between the Phoenician traders and the ancient Sardinians. These landings constituted small markets where the most varied merchandise were exchanged. With the constant prosperity of trade, the villages grew more and more, welcoming the exodus of Phoenician families fleeing from Lebanon. In this distant land they continued to practice their lifestyle, their own uses, their traditions and their cults of origin, bringing new technologies and knowledge to Sardinia.

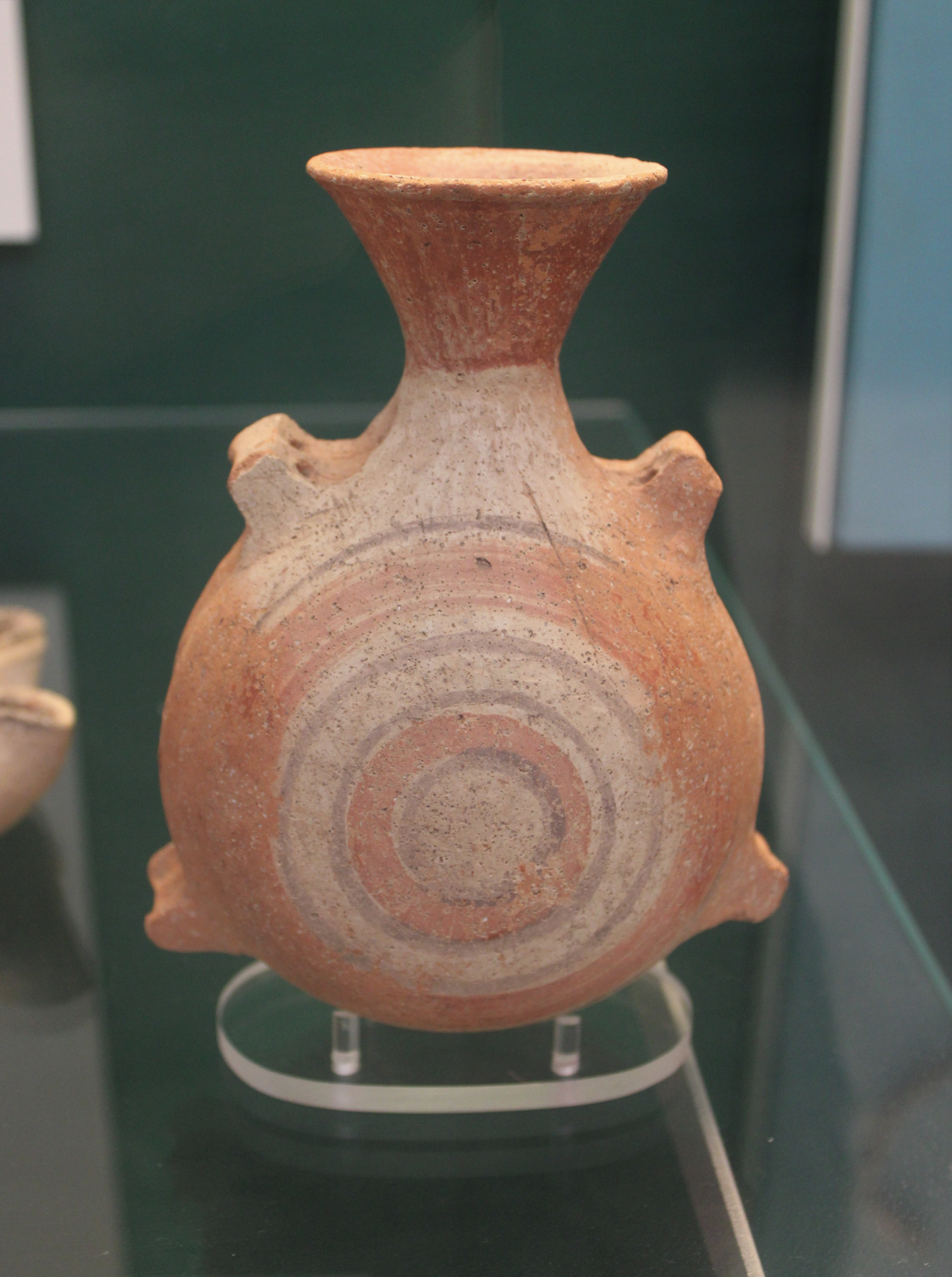
Pilgrim flask from Tharros. Phoenician period, 7th-6th century BC

Through mixed marriages and in a fruitful and continuous cultural exchange, the two peoples coexisted peacefully and the coastal villages became important urban centers, organized in a similar way to the ancient city-states of the Lebanese coasts. The first settlements arose in Karalis, Olbia, Nora (near Pula), Bithia, Sulki on the Sant'Antioco island, and Tharros on the Sinis peninsula, then in Neapolis near Guspini, and in Bosa. At the same time as the prosperity of these coastal centers in Sardinia, on the other side of the Mediterranean, on the African continent, in 814 BC according to the classical tradition, Carthage was born, and sixty years later, in the Italian peninsula, Rome.

The Nuragic people and Phoenician settlers engaged in trade and cultural exchange, though occasional conflicts occurred. Unlike later Carthaginian domination, this period featured mutual influence, with Nuragic communities actively participating in Mediterranean trade while selectively adopting Phoenician customs. Phoenicians established coastal trading posts to access Sardinia's metal resources, particularly lead and silver. In exchange, Nuragic elites traded bronze figurines (Nuragic bronze statuettes) for luxury goods like glass and ivory.

Cultural blending is evident in hybrid artifacts such as Sant'Imbenia pottery (combining Nuragic and Phoenician styles) and tombs with Phoenician designs built using Nuragic techniques. While defensive towers like Su Nuraxi suggest tensions, shared workshops at Sulcis indicate cooperation. Scholars debate whether relations were primarily cooperative or coercive, citing evidence of both Nuragic autonomy in rural areas and Phoenician economic influence. These interactions set the stage for later Carthaginian rule, though Nuragic traditions persisted in Sardinia's interior.

=== Urbanism and writing ===
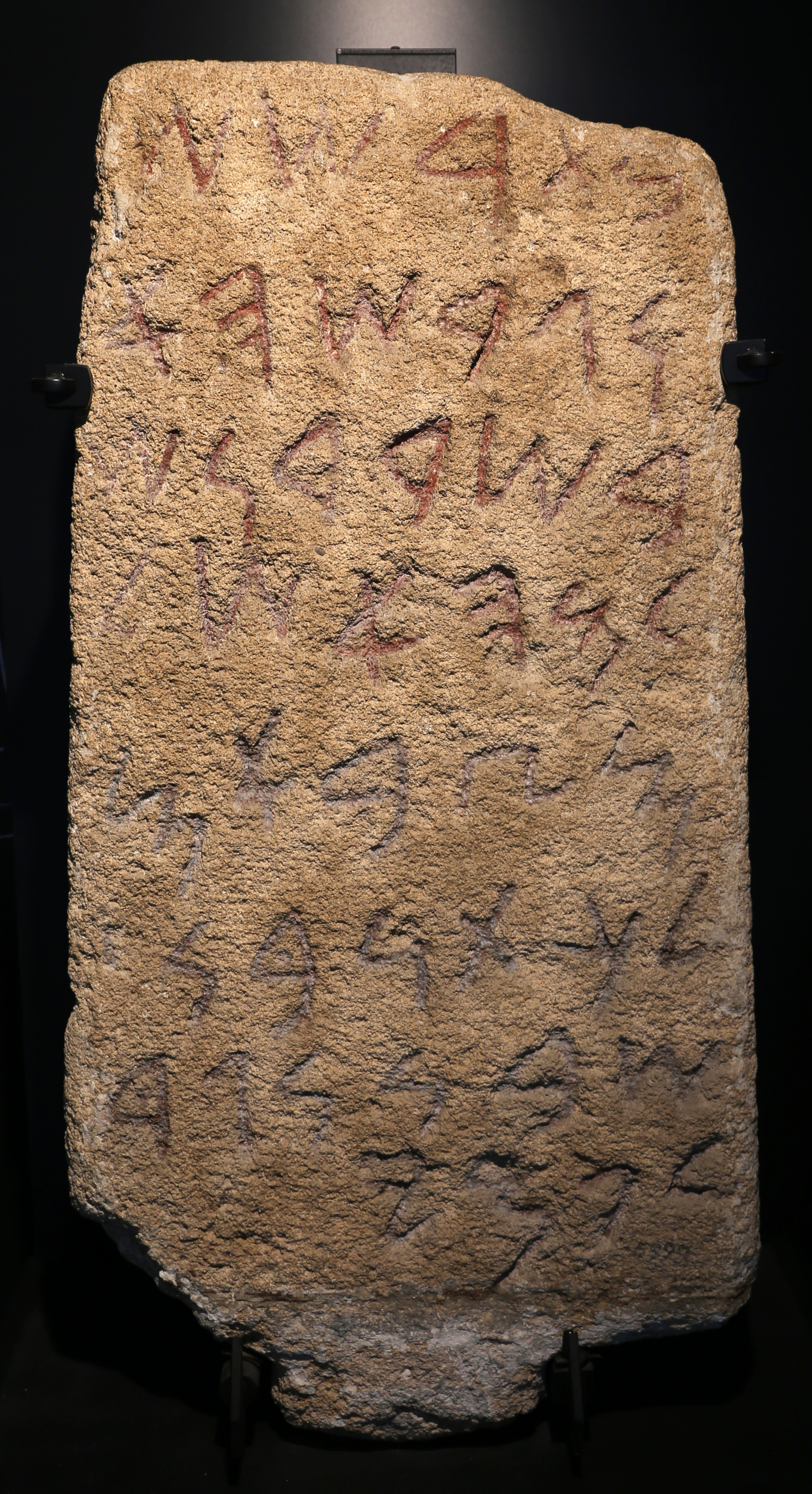
Nora Stone

The Phoenicians introduced to Sardinia a form of urban aggregation hitherto unknown to the natives: the city. The Nuragic clans lived in cantons, i.e. vast well-defined territories controlled by Nuragic towers located in strategic points. They were very skilled in designing and building complex defensive agglomerations and close to these, outside the walls, villages were located, ready to be evacuated in case of attack. Just as the Nuragics divided the island into cantons, so the now Sardo-Phoenicians organized the coastal villages in well-organized cities.

A sepulchral stele dated to the 9th century BC was found in Nora and preserved in the Museo Archeologico Nazionale di Cagliari; according to many researchers, this stele is also the first testimony attesting to the written name used to name Sardinia. The toponym Shrdn appears on the stele, without vowels as is customary in the ancient Semitic languages.

=== Art and religion ===
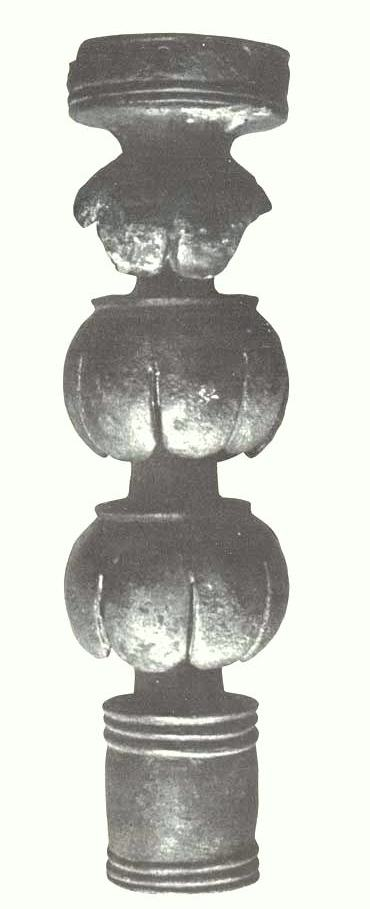
Phoenician torch holder from Santa Vittoria

Nuragic art and religious rituals during Phoenician contact show a mix of cultural traditions, the bronze statuettes at that time adopted Middle Eastern-style oranti style, which was similar to Phoenician religious statues. These hybrid artworks found at sites such as Santa Cristina (Paulilatino) have retained both the Nuragic geometric patterns with Phoenician details like almond-shaped eyes and draped clothing.

There is also a convergence in religious practice. At Santa Vittoria of Serri, Nuragic water rituals incorporated symbols of the Phoenician goddess Tanit, such as crescent moons and clay figurines. In return, Phoenician shrines in coastal hubs included Nuragic offerings like tiny bronze boats, showing two-way cultural exchange.

Scholars believe that this fusion was strategic as the Nuragic leaders strengthened their religious authority by absorbing foreign elements, while preserving the indigenous traditions.

=== Architectural exchange ===
The blending of Nuragic and Phoenician architecture is obvious at Monte Sirai, where Phoenician-style tombs were built using Nuragic stonework techniques, combining Middle Eastern designs with local massive stone blocks. Besides, city layouts mixed Nuragic circular huts with Phoenician rectangular buildings and grid-like streets at Tharros, showing practical collaboration. This integration extended to religious sites, with the Nuragic holy well incorporating Phoenician symbols, while the Phoenician temple was made of Sardinian basalt materials.

These innovations position Sardinia as a cultural mediator, reconciling practical needs with symbolic preservation. Defensive towers like Su Nuraxi were strategically reinforced (e.g., entryways) during Phoenician contact, reflecting adaptive power negotiations. Such exchanges dismantle "conquest" narratives, revealing an era of equitable cultural coexistence.

== Carthage ==
=== Military expansion of Carthage ===
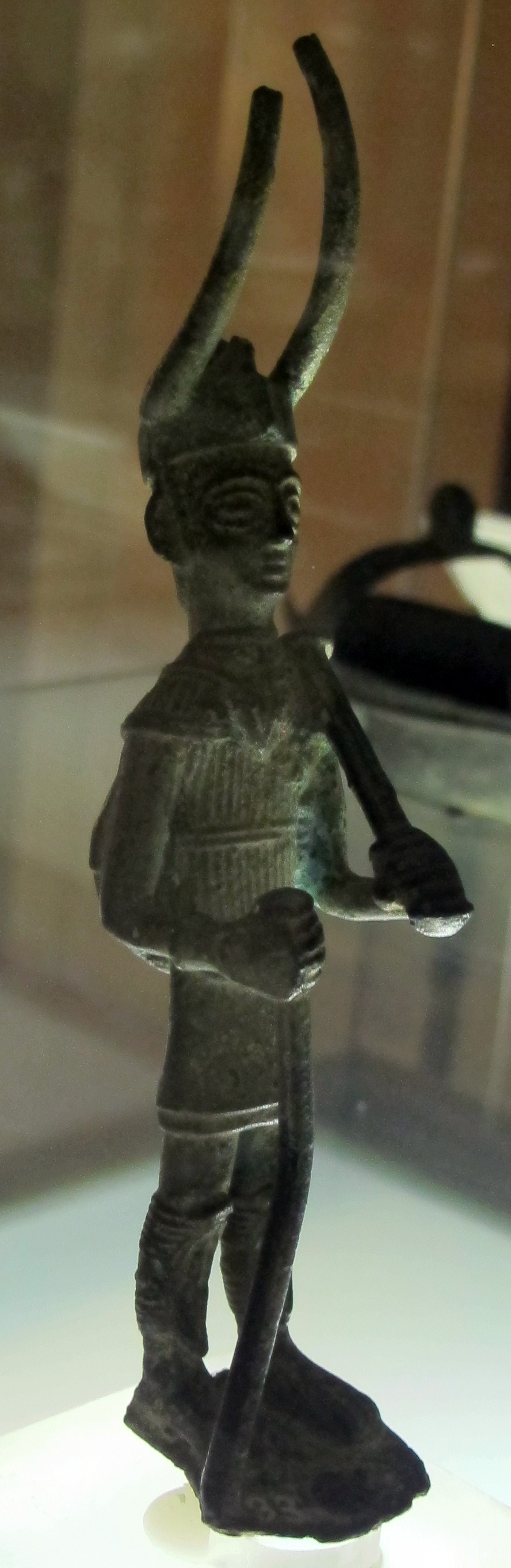
Sardinian Warrior with horned helmet

Known for their prosperity, the city-states of Sardinia entered into Carthage's orbit of expansion. The nascent Punic colonial power, projected towards the conquest of the merchant routes in the western Mediterranean, was interested not only in controlling the territory of the coastal urban centers, but also the fertile plains of the interior, and above all the exclusive exploitation of the rich metal mines. A long war began which saw the Punics penetrate towards the inland territories.

In defense of Punic interests, in 540 BC Carthage sent an expert general to Sardinia, already victorious in Sicily against the Greeks and called Malchus (i.e. the King) by them. Having landed on the island with an expeditionary force made up of the Punic elites, with the task of freeing the coastal cities from the impending danger of annihilation, Malchus found the organized resistance of the Nuragic Sardinians. Overwhelmed by continuous attacks and the guerrilla that developed around their movements, the Carthaginians were forced to retreat and re-embark suffering heavy losses. The intervention of Carthage was described by the Roman historian Justin, and it seems that in the African motherland this defeat was described as a disaster, so much so that it subsequently motivated extensive civil and military reforms. After these events, the army was strengthened and became the symbol and instrument of the Carthaginian desire for domination.

After the victorious Battle of Alalia against the Phocaea Greeks, the Punics under the command of the two brothers Hasdrubal and Hamilcar, sons of Mago, in 535 BC led a new military campaign for the conquest of the island. In 509 BC the Southern and Central-western portion of Sardinia was in the hands of Carthage.

=== Carthaginian transition ===
The Carthaginian annexation of Sardinia marked a pivotal turning point, replacing the cooperative Nuragic-Phoenician equilibrium with centralized Punic governance and resource extraction. Coastal cities like Karalis (Cagliari) and Nora adopted Punic administration and Tophet shrines. In contrast, the inland Nuragic community persisted and also maintained indigenous pottery-making traditions.

This dichotomy created a fragmented cultural landscape, with the Punic hegemony of the coastal cities coexisting with the enduring autonomy of Nuragic people in the mountainous hinterland. The Iglesiente mines operated under Carthaginian oversight, yet rural areas preserved traditional bronze-working. These divisions persisted through the Roman conquest (238 BCE), with Latin sources distinguishing coastal "Sardi Punic" from inland "Sardi Pelliti" tribes.

=== Punic fortification system ===
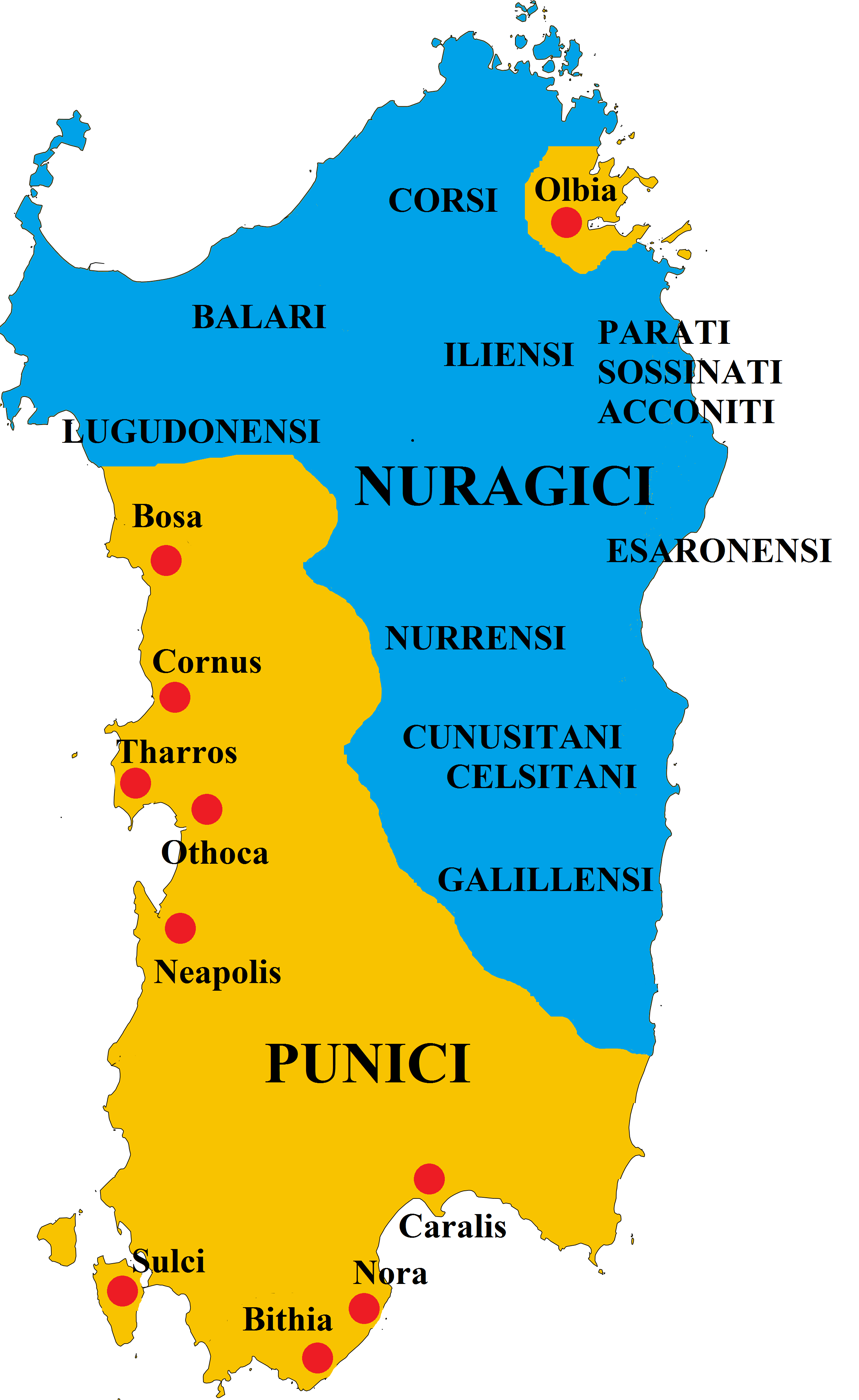
In yellow the territories occupied by Carthage with the red dots being their most notable settlements.

The duration of the Punic presence in Sardinia is believed to be about 271 years, until the Roman invasion in 238 BC. During this period, the continuous wars were followed by a phase of settling, determined by the arrest of the Carthaginian penetration at the foot of the mountain massifs of the Barbagia and the ridge of the Goceano.

To defend against the indigenous people, a limes went from Padria to Macomer, Bonorva, Bolotana, Sedilo, Neoneli, Fordongianus, Samugheo, Asuni, Genoni, Isili, Orroli, Goni, Ballao to the mouth of the Flumendosa.

Carthaginian coins found within the indigenous Sardinian territories suggest that despite the limes, trade exchanges existed between the two peoples. The centers that stood near the border area were strengthened and new settlements were founded in inland areas.

=== End of Punic rule ===
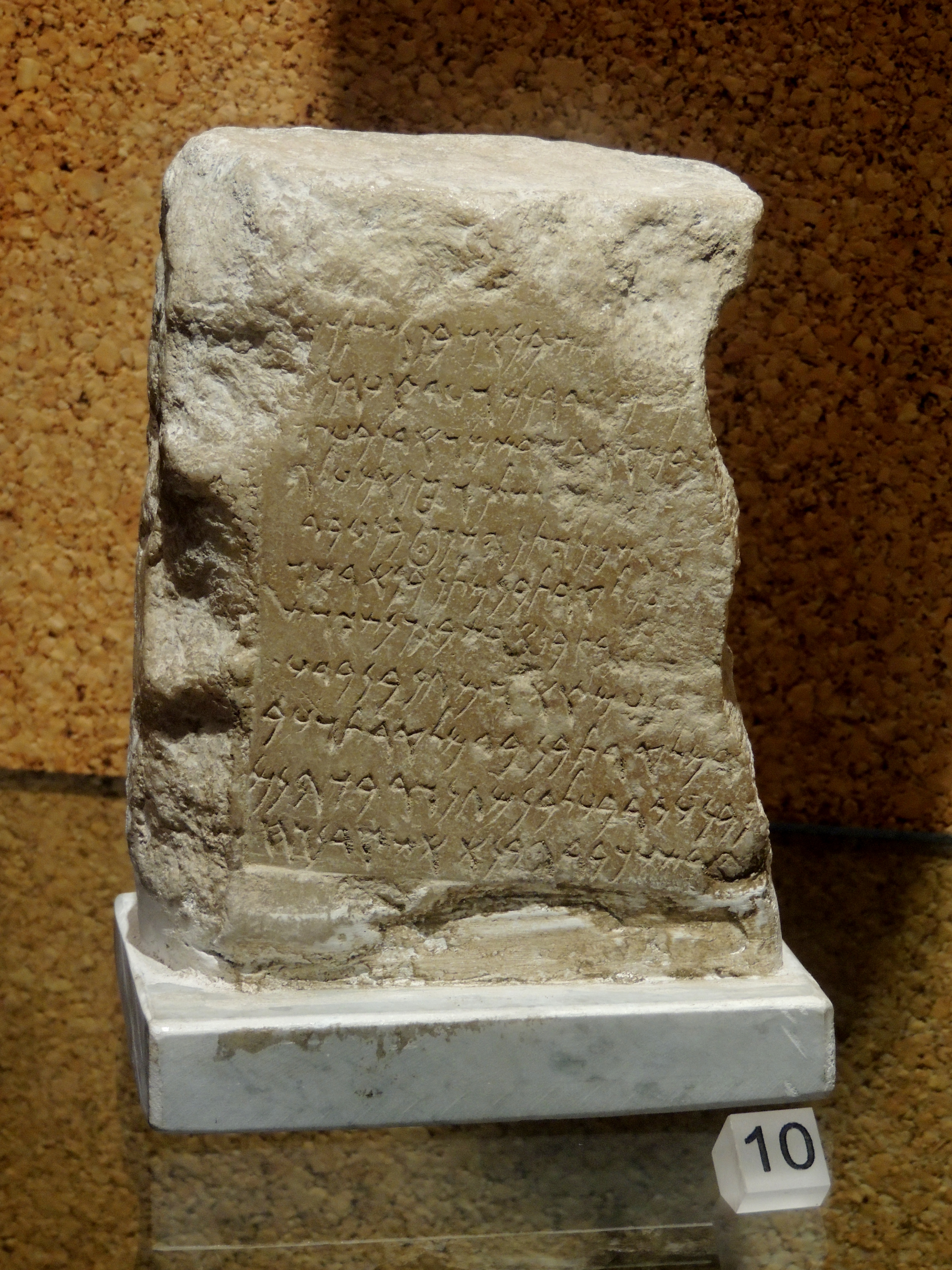
Punic era inscription from Cagliari (the Giardino Birocchi inscription)

In 368 BC the Sardinians, after almost 150 years of occupation, revolted against Carthage who sent his armies to the island to quell the uprising.

In 238, after the First Punic War, the Romans, in the course of the Mercenary War, took control of Sardinia and Corsica who later become their second province after Sicily.

== Modern reassessment ==
Recent studies have challenged past beliefs that depicted Nuragic history during this period as being in decline, instead highlighting local resilience and cultural endurance. Burgers (2013) argues against the idea that the Nuragic people were conquered, showing how rural communities kept traditions alive, like repurposing ancient stone towers (nuraghe) and making traditional pottery, even under Carthaginian (Punic) rule. Digs at sites like Santa Vittoria show rituals at sacred wells continued uninterrupted, while metalworking studies prove inland areas maintained bronze production methods for centuries.

Giovanni Lilliu (2003) and newer findings demonstrate Sardinia's active Mediterranean role, not passive submission. This is in line with views that emphasize adaptation over cultural replacement. Hybrid objects like Phoenician-Nuragic stelae show selective adoption of foreign elements to bolster local authority.

== Genetics ==
Sarno et al. (2021) analysed ancient Punic individuals from the necropolis of Tharros in Sardinia (5th – 3rd century BC). The study demonstrates that Punic-related individuals from Tharros fall in an intermediate position between modern Southern European Iberians and North African populations, while present-day Sardinians form a clade with pre-Phoenician Sardinian populations dated between the Neolithic and the Nuragic periods. The results shows that female mobility from Iberia and North Africa to Sardinia was associated with Punic communities.

A genetic study published in Nature Communications in March 2022 examined the remains of 30 ancient individuals from Carthaginian and Etruscan port cities around the central Mediterranean, in Tunisia, Sardinia, and central Italy. During the Early and Middle Iron Age, many individual genomes from Sardinia show affinities with the Punic population of Kerkouane, reflecting the island's connection to Carthage. In contrast, during the Late Iron Age, individuals exhibit affinities with populations from mainland Italy and Sicily, reflecting the incorporation of Sardinia into the Roman Empire.

A genetic study published in Nature Communications in April 2025 examined the remains of 196 individuals from 14 sites traditionally identified as Phoenician and Punic, including ones in Sicily and Sardinia. The results suggest that during the earlier stages of the Phoenician colonization, the Punic demographic expansion was primarily driven by the spread of people with Sicilian-Aegean ancestry, while Levantine Phoenicians made little to no genetic contribution to Punic settlements in the central and western Mediterranean. The North African ancestry became widespread only after 400 BCE in the Punic world, suggesting that expanding Carthaginian influence facilitated this spread. However, this was a minority contributor of ancestry in all of the sampled sites, including in Carthage itself.

== Gallery ==
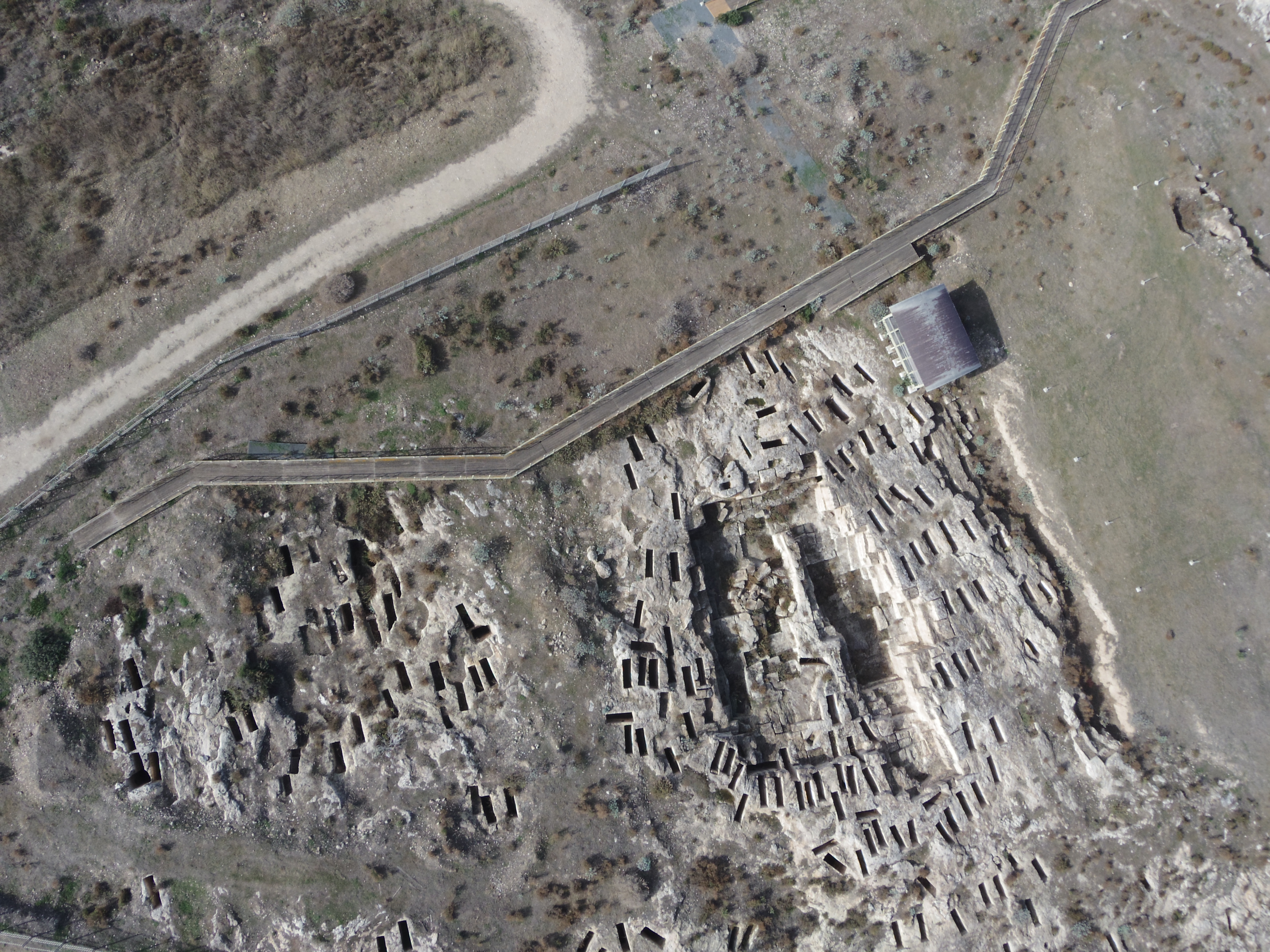
Necropolis of Tuvixeddu, Cagliari

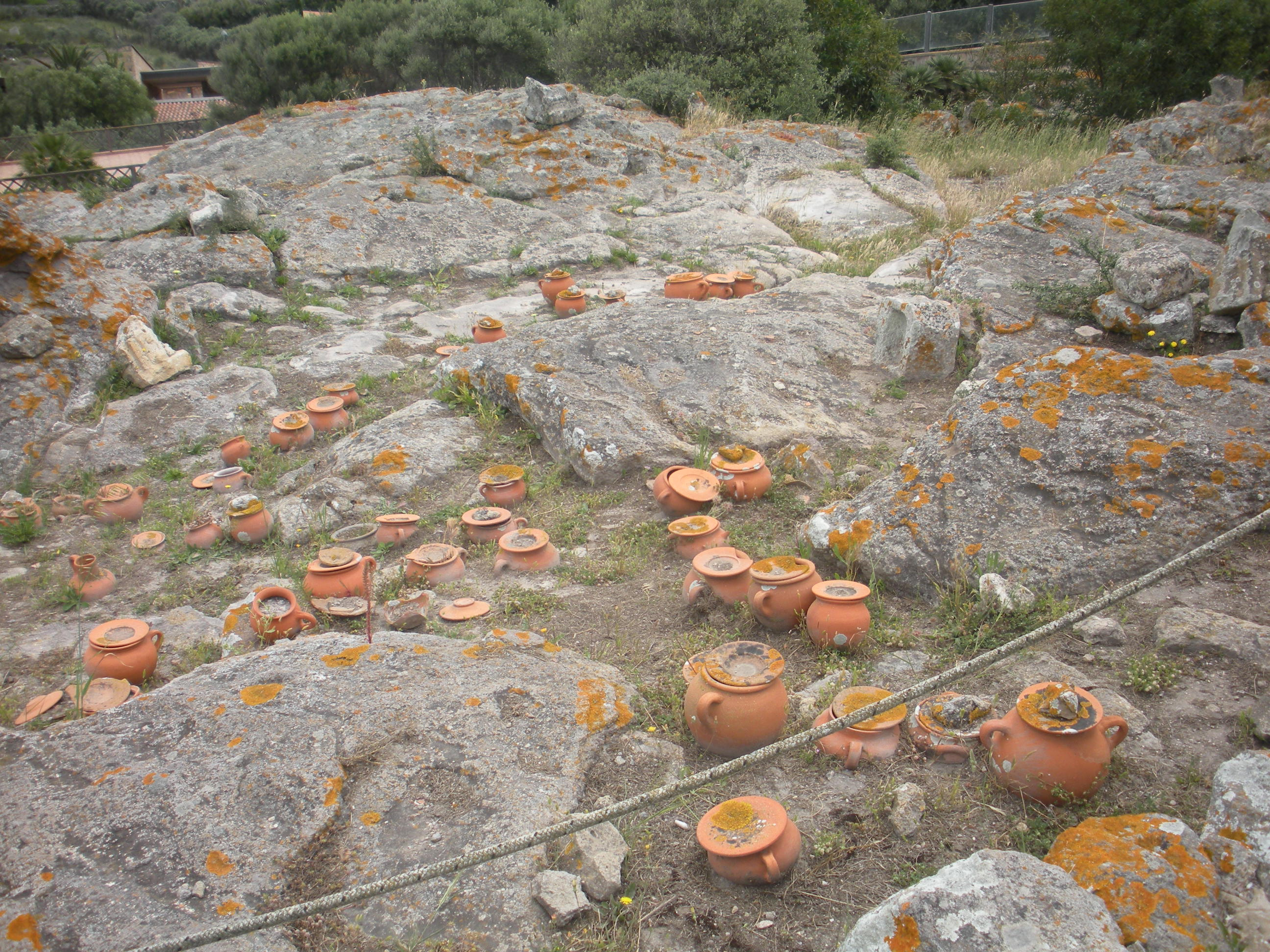
Tophet of Sulki

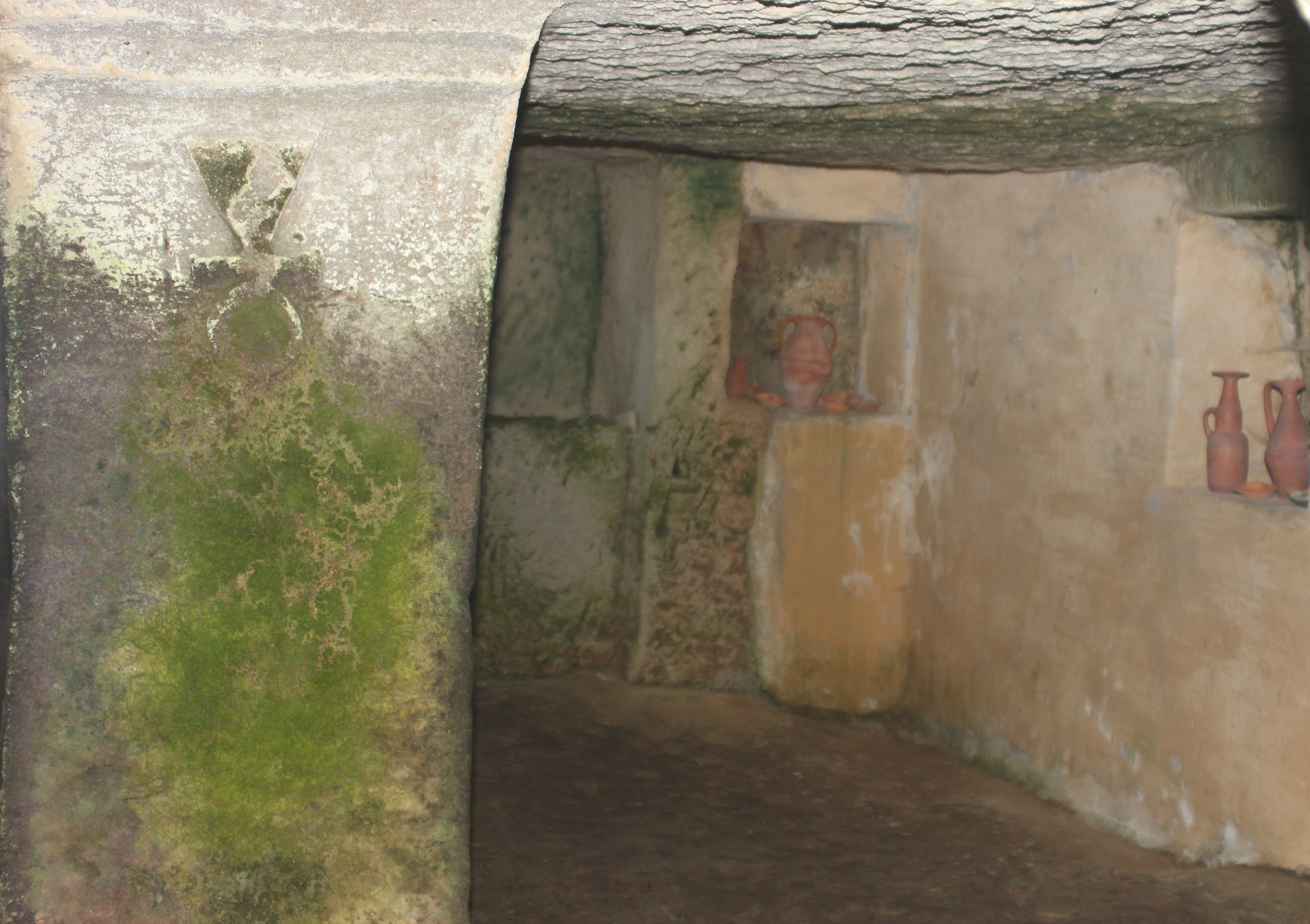
Hypogeum at Monte Sirai

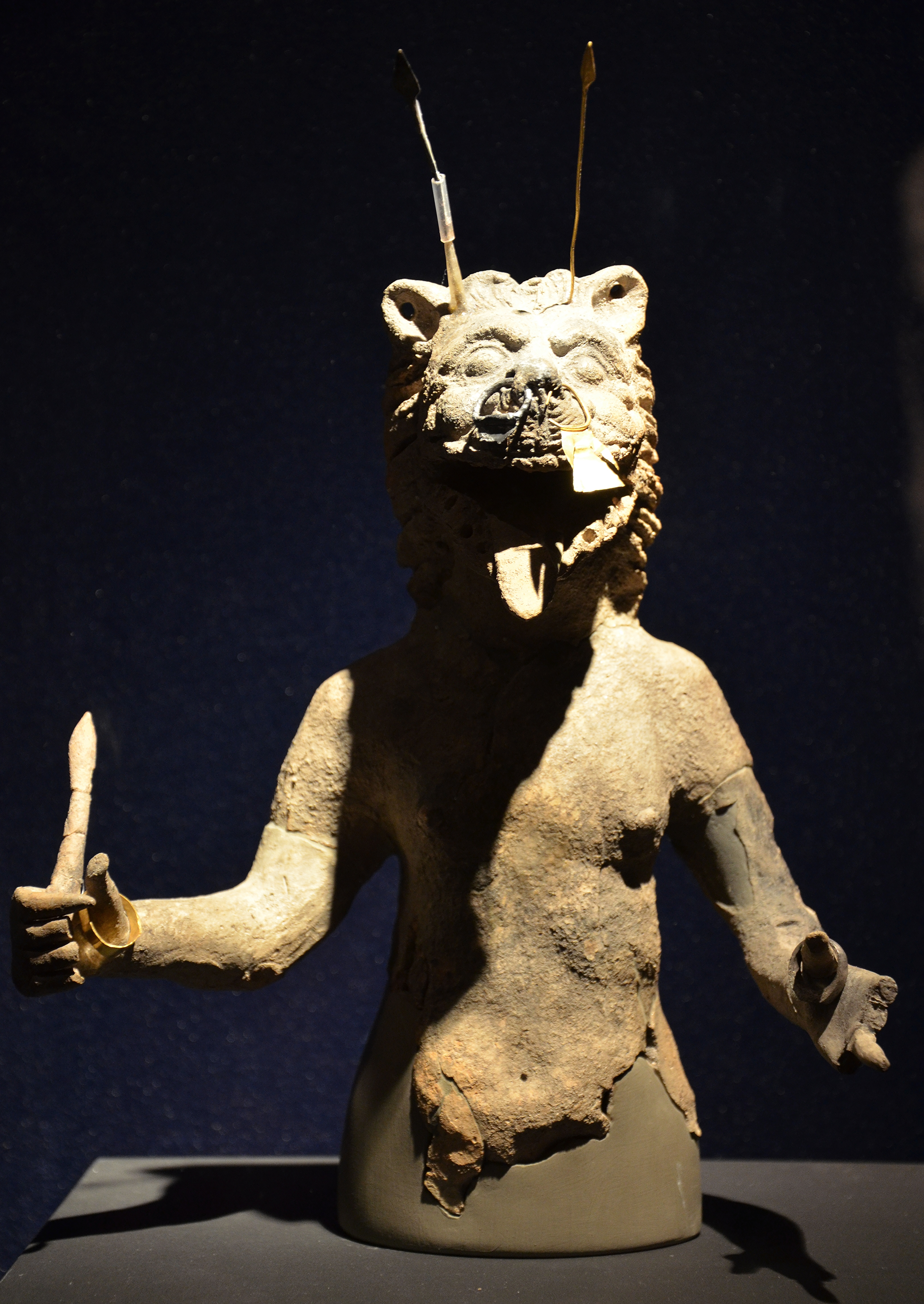
Terracotta statue of lion-headed man with gold and silver insets, 6th-5th century BC, from Tharros

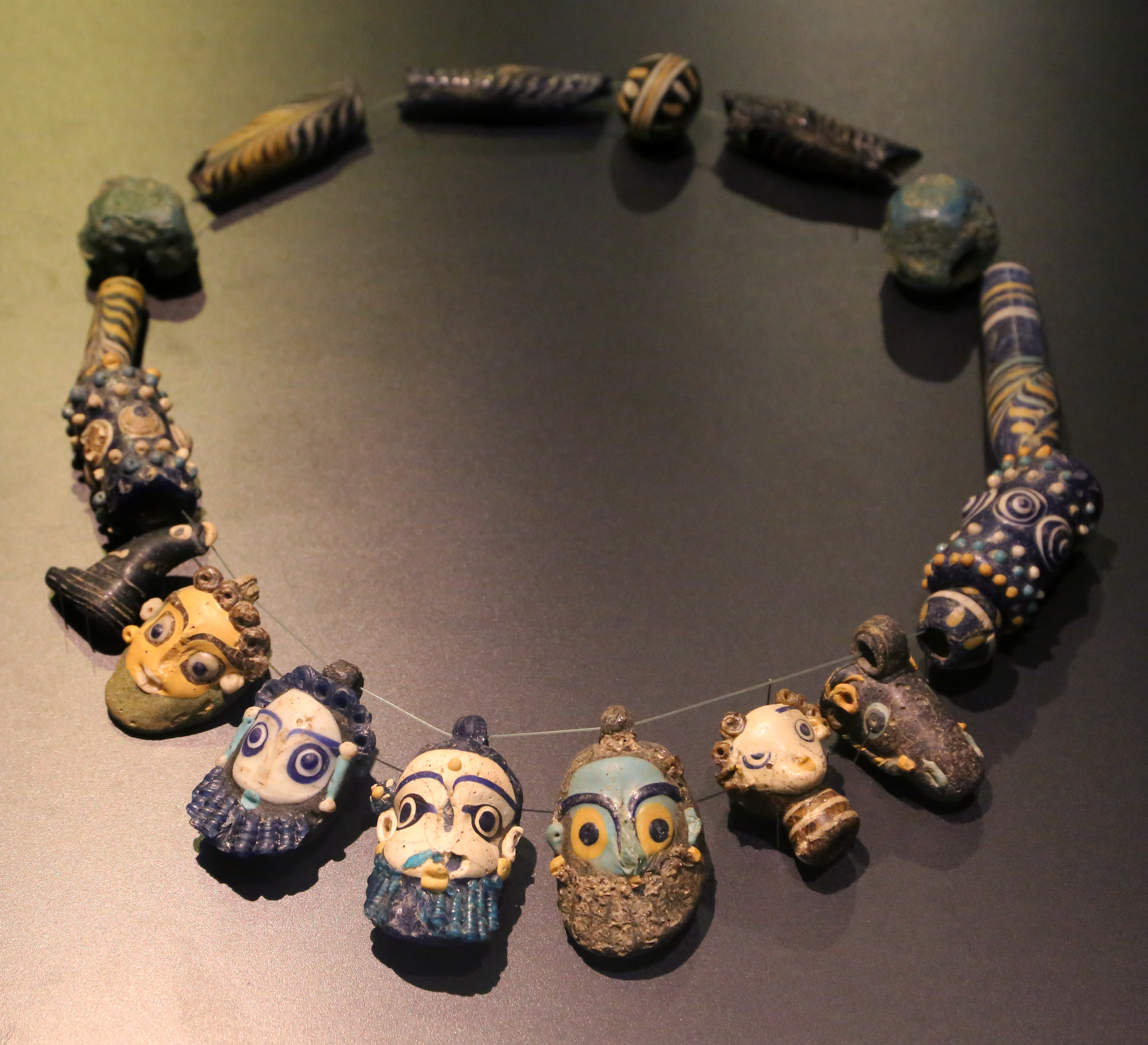
Punic necklace from Olbia

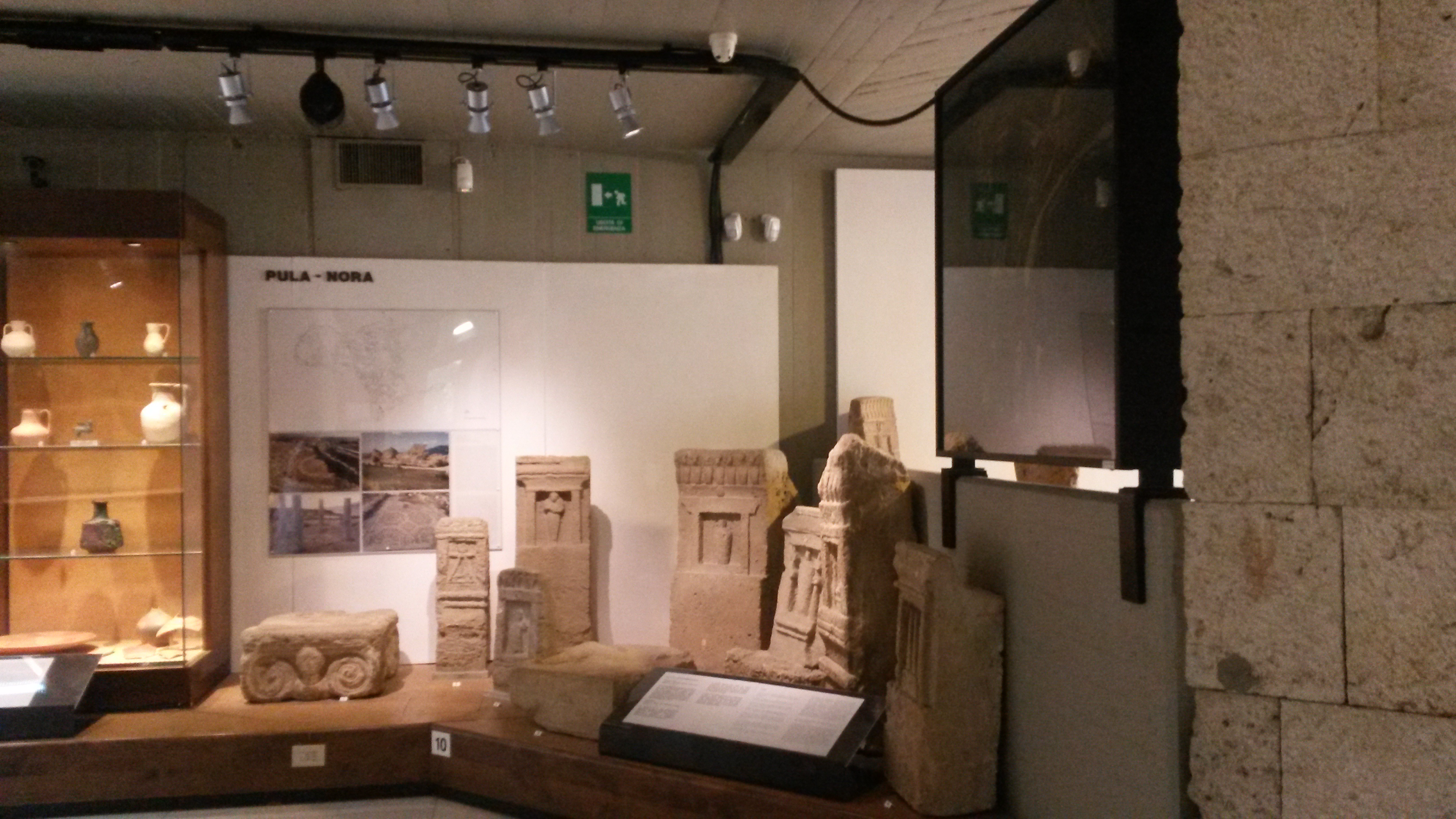
Stelae from Nora

== See also ==
- Punic people
- History of Sardinia

== Bibliography ==
- Brigaglia, Manlio, ed. (1995). Storia della Sardegna. Soter editrice.
- Artizzu, Francesco, ed. (1967). La società in Sardegna nei secoli. Torino: ERI – Edizioni RAI Radiotelevisione Italiana.
- F. Barreca, Il retaggio di Cartagine in Sardegna, Cagliari 1960.
- Barreca, F (1988). La civiltà fenicio punica in Sardegna (PDF). Sassari: Carlo Delfino Editore. Archived from the original (PDF) on 25 June 2013.
- Casula, Francesco Cesare (1994). La Storia di Sardegna. Sassari: Carlo Delfino editore.
- G. Pesce, Sardegna punica, Fossataro, Cagliari 1960; riedizione Ilisso Edizioni, Nuoro 2000, ISBN 88-87825-13-0; in PDF:
- G. Pesce, Civiltà punica in Sardegna, Roma 1963.
- G. Lilliu, Rapporti tra civiltà nuragica e la civiltà fenicio punica in Sardegna, in Studi Etruschi.
- S. Moscati, La penetrazione fenicio-punica in Sardegna.
- Sabatino Moscati, Il simbolo di Tanit a Monte Sirai, in Rivista degli studi orientali, Roma 1964
- A. Succa, L'impero coloniale di Cartagine (Parte II, Capitolo II, La colonizzazione della Sardegna), Lecce-Roma, 2021.
