= Hamilcar =

Hamilcar (Punic: 𐤇𐤌𐤋𐤊, ḤMLK, or 𐤇𐤌𐤋𐤒𐤓𐤕, ḤMLQRT, "Melqart is Gracious"; Ancient Greek: Ἁμίλκας, Hamílkas;) was a common Carthaginian masculine given name. The name was particularly common among the ruling families of ancient Carthage.

People named Hamilcar include:

- Hamilcar the Magonid, "King" of Carthage, led the Carthaginian forces at the Battle of Himera in 480 BC during the First Sicilian War
- Hamilcar, a general against Timoleon of Syracuse
- Hamilcar, a brother of Gisco, possibly brother of Hanno II, with whom he was executed in the middle of the 3rd century BC
- Hamilcar the Rhodian, possibly a Carthaginian spy in the entourage of Alexander the Great, executed when returning to Carthage.
- Hamilcar, son of Gisco and grandson of Hanno the Great, led a campaign against Agathocles of Syracuse during the Third Sicilian War. He defeated Agathocles in the Battle of the Himera River in 311 BC. He was captured during the Siege of Syracuse and then killed in 309 BC.
- Hamilcar, a general in Sicily and Africa from 261 to 255 BC during the First Punic War, distinct from the Hamilcar mentioned by Diodorus
- Hamilcar was a Carthaginian commander whose greatest achievement was winning the Battle of Drepanum in 249 BC during the First Punic War.
- Hamilcar Barca (c. 270–228 BC) served as a Carthaginian general during and after the First Punic War. His son was Hannibal, famous for his exploits during the Second Punic War.
- Hamilcar Rashed Jr. (born 1998), American football player

In various forms, the name sometimes appears in other cultures. The Italian name Amilcare was one of the given names of the dictator Benito Mussolini and the composer Amilcare Ponchielli. The Portuguese name Amílcar was one of the given names of the prominent African revolutionary Amílcar Cabral.

== See also ==
- General Aircraft Hamilcar — the World War II glider
- Amilcar — French-made automobile from the 1920s and 1930s
- Amílcar Cabral — African nationalist
- Amilcare Cipriani — Italian anarchist
- Amilcare Ponchielli — Italian composer
- Amilcar Hasenfratz — a pseudonym of Frédéric Bartholdi
