= Alalia (disambiguation) =

Alalia mostly refers to speech delay. It can also refer to

- Alalia syllabaris, stuttering
- Latin name of port city and former bishopric Aléria, on Corsica
  - Battle of Alalia (530-535 BC)
- Al-Alia, Morocco

== See also ==
- Echolalia
