= Magonids =

Carthaginian aristocratic family

The Magonids were a political dynasty of Ancient Carthage from 550 BCE to 340 BCE. The dynasty was first established under Mago I, under whom Carthage became pre-eminent among the Phoenician colonies in the western Mediterranean. Under the Magonids, the Carthaginian Empire expanded to include Sardinia, Libya, and for almost a decade much of Sicily.

== Nature of Magonid rule ==
Leading experts on Carthage have been sceptical as to whether it is even possible to reconstruct the internal history of Carthage, and this needs to be borne in mind in relation to the Magonids. Mago and his successors probably ruled less like kings and more like tyrants or political strongmen. Diodorus, however, describes them as kings according to the law, which implies a legal procedure rather than a naked seizure of power. Similarly, Herodotus tells us that Hamilcar I was "king by valour," implying selection rather than hereditary succession.

In 480 BCE, after Hamilcar I's death, the king lost most of his power to an aristocratic Council of Elders. In 308 BCE, Hannonian Bomilcar attempted a coup d'état to restore the monarch to full power, but failed, so that Carthage became in name as well as in fact a republic.

== List of leaders ==
- Mago I: Justin tells us that he was chosen as general after his predecessor was ousted for seeking royal power.
- Hasdrubal I: son of Mago and invested eleven times with the office of 'dictator'.
- Hamilcar I: led the expedition to Sicily of 480 BCE
- Hanno: The son of the Hamilcar who was killed at Himera in 480 BCE. It has been conjectured that he was Hanno the Navigator.
- Himilco I: (in Sicily) 460–410 BCE
- Hannibal I: Grandson of Hamilcar and led the response to Segesta's call for help in 410 BCE
- Himilco II: Laid siege to Syracuse 396 BCE.
- Mago II: 396–375 BCE
- Mago III: 375–344 BCE

== Rule ==
With the arrival of Mago, Carthaginian foreign policy appears to have changed dramatically. If previously Carthage had tentatively colonized the island of Ibiza on its own, it now took the lead, establishing itself firmly as the dominant Phoenician military power in the western Mediterranean.

Mago was succeeded by his son Hasdrubal I. The next successor was Hamilcar I, the son of Hasdrubal's brother Hanno. Carthage, always trying to rid itself of its opponent, the Greeks, might even have entered into an alliance with the Persian Xerxes (the accounts are unsure) in order to defeat the joint foe. Herodotus tells that it was believed that the decisive battle of Himera between Carthaginian and Greek forces on Sicily took place on the very same day that the Greeks met with the Persians in the famous battle of Salamis in 480 BCE in Greece itself. But the Greeks were victorious in both battles and Hamilcar met his death at Himera.

After Hamilcar's death, the dynasty continued with Hamilcar's son Hanno II 'the Navigator' up to 440 BCE, under whom a large part of Carthage's African dominions were conquered and more of the Atlantic coast of Africa was explored and settled. Great advances were also made in African inland trade. Meanwhile, Carthage appeared to make an effort in keeping itself out of any new wars on Sicily.

This peace and newly acquired vast trading empire also helped rebuild the Carthaginian military forces. By 410 BCE Hannibal I (son of Gisco and grandson of Hamilcar) was the king of Carthage. He immediately set out on a new campaign in Sicily, which in 409 BCE ended in the utter destruction of the city of Selinus, ally of the powerful Greek city state of Syracuse. Hannibal achieved true notoriety with the sheer destruction he wrought and with the cruelty with which he slaughtered thousands of prisoners.

It was at the siege of the Greek city of Agrigentum that an epidemic swept through the Carthaginian camp which killed Hannibal. Hannibal's cousin Himilco II (son of Hanno the Navigator and grandson of Hamilcar) now assumed the reins of power of Carthage. He was only formally crowned king in 396 BCE, but this most likely means that a Carthaginian king could only be installed in the city of Carthage itself and so he had to wait to receive his title formally until he returned home from Sicily.

He spent his time on Sicily in an on-and-off war with the great Syracusan tyrant Dionysius I of Syracuse until in 396 BCE he was disastrously defeated, fleeing Sicily with Carthaginian refugees whilst abandoning his remaining mercenary troops to be slaughtered by the victorious Greeks. Himilco later committed suicide.

Mago II, another member of this family inherited the title of leader at first. His first task was to try and quell a Libyan revolt which came close to overthrowing Carthaginian rule altogether. Thereafter he set out to Sicily again and later even to southern Italy, to occupy himself with Dionysius. What Mago II lacked in military ability he made up for with diplomatic skill. But finally he fell in the Battle of Cabala (378/375 BCE) in southern Italy against the Syracusan army. Finally, Carthage and Syracuse agreed a peace.

In 480 BCE, following Hamilcar I's death, the King lost most of his power to an aristocratic Council of Elders. In 308 BCE, Bomilcar attempted a coup d'etat to restore the monarch to full power, but failed, which led to Carthage becoming in name as well as in fact a republic.

== Timeline ==
550 BCE: Mago I takes power.

540 BCE: A Carthaginian-Etruscan alliance had expelled the Greeks from Corsica after the Battle of Alalia.

530 BCE: Mago dies and Hasdrubal I takes power.

Mid 520s BCE: Hasdrubal, along with his brother Hamilcar I, launches an expedition against Sardinia.

510 BCE: Hamilcar I takes power.

509 BCE: Treaty was signed between Carthage and Rome indicating a division of influence and commercial activities. This is the first known source indicating that Carthage had gained control over Sicily and Sardinia, as well as Emporia and the area south of Cape Bon in Africa.

483 BCE: Carthage launches First Sicilian War against Greece in an attempt to gain control of Sicily

480 BCE: Carthage suffers a disastrous loss at Battle of Himera in which Hamilcar is killed, ending the First Sicilian War. Hanno II, also known as Hanno the Navigator, takes power. The Tribunal of 104 is established, severely weakening the power of the Kings. Carthage becomes a republic.

440 BCE: Hanno's reign ends, under whom a large part of Africa was added to Carthage's dominion and more of the Atlantic coast of Africa was explored and settled. Himilco I takes power.

410 BCE: Hannibal I takes power. The same year, he invades Sicily.

409 BCE: Invasion of Sicily ends with destruction of the city of Selinus, ally of the powerful Greek city of Syracuse.

406 BCE: Himilco II takes power after Hannibal dies of disease.

396 BCE: Himilco is disastrously defeated in Sicily by Dionysius I of Syracuse and commits suicide. Mago II takes power.

392 BCE: After crushing Libyan revolt, Mago ends war with Dionysus in Sicily.

378/375 BCE: Mago defeated and killed at Battle of Cabala in central Sicily by the Syracusan army.

377 BCE??: Mago's son Himilco Mago defeats Dionysius at Battle of Cronium. Syracuse and Carthage make peace.

348 BCE: Second treaty signed with Rome, now a significant power in Italy.

344 BCE: Mago III dies. Hanno III takes power.

340 BCE: Hanno III attempts a coup d'etat against the Council of Elders to restore full monarchical power, but he fails, and is executed.

== See also ==
- Barcids
