= Karalis =

Karalis is a Greek surname. Notable people with the surname include:

- Emmanouil Karalis (born 1999), Greek pole vaulter
- Giannis Karalis (born 1988), Greek professional footballer
- Tom Karalis (born 1964), Canadian-American former ice hockey defenceman
