= Bomilcar (4th century BC) =

Ancient Carthaginian politician and general

Bomilcar (Punic: 𐤁𐤃𐤌𐤋𐤒𐤓𐤕, bdmlqrt) was a Carthaginian commander in the war against Agathocles of Syracuse, who invaded Africa in 310 BC.

In the first battle with the invaders, his colleague Hanno was killed and, according to Diodorus, Bomilcar permitted the enemy to succeed on the field with the hope that his frightened countrymen would permit him to become tyrant of Carthage. In 308 BC, after many delays and misgivings, he attempted to seize the government with the aid of 500 citizens and a number of mercenaries, but his followers were induced to desert him by promises of pardon. He himself was taken and crucified.

== See also ==
- Other Bomilcars in Carthaginian history
- Melqart, the Canaanite deity
