= Malchus (general) =

Carthaginian general and statesman

Malchus (/ˈmælkəs/; Punic: 𐤌𐤋𐤒 mlq, or 𐤌𐤋𐤊 mlk; Ancient Greek: Μάλχος, Malkhōs) was a Carthaginian general and statesman in the 6th century BCE. It was under his tenure that the systematic conquest of the rest of coastal North Africa by Carthage began.

== Biography ==
He was sent to Sicily as commander sometime after 576 BC, likely due to the Phoenician (and possibly also Elymian) cities' pleas for help against Greek expansion westward into the island. It is not certain whether Carthaginian troops were already stationed on Sicily beforehand. It's possible that Malchus captured the Greek city of Selinus and the Phoenician colonies of Motya, Panormus and Soluntum during the ensuing battles. Although it remains unclear whether he fought against Pentathlus of Cnidus or the tyrant Phalaris of Akragas, it is safe to assume that Malchus was generally successful with his campaign on the island.

Towards the middle of the 6th century BCE, he waged war against the Libu for control over Libya.

Around 540 BC, Malchus was sent to Sardinia at the command of an army, numbering 80,000 men according to the Roman historian Justin, presumably to support the resident Phoenicians against the indigenous Nuragic Sardinians. With several military victories, he succeeded in establishing Punic settlements on the island. Though after a decisive defeat, he and his remaining troops were exiled by the Carthaginian People's Assembly. In response, Malchus besieged Carthage with his army. During the siege, he had his son Carthalo, who had refused to join his side, seized and crucified. Soon after, he managed to conquer the city and have ten elders, who had advocated for his exile, executed. Nonetheless, he was eventually brought to justice by Mago, among others, for attempting to seize the throne, and executed.

== Bibliography ==
- Marcus Junianus Justinus, Epitoma historiarum Philippicarum XIII,7 & XXIV,7,7–15
- Orosius, Historiae adversum Paganos 4,6,8.

== See also ==
- Sicilian Wars
- Magonid dynasty
- Carthalo, an officer during the Second Punic War
- History of Sardinia
- Military of Carthage
