= Gisgo =

Gisgo or Gisco is the latinization or hellenization (Ancient Greek: Γέσκων, Géskōn) of the Punic masculine given name Gersakkun (𐤂𐤓𐤎𐤊𐤍, GRSKN). The name means "Client of Sakkun".

Notable people with the name Gisgo or Gisco include:

- Gisco, a son of Carthaginian general Hamilcar, exiled after the Battle of Himera in 480 BC
- Gisco (died 239 BC), a Carthaginian general who served during the closing years of the First Punic War and took a leading part in the events which sparked the Mercenary War
- Gisgo, son of Hanno the Great, who was a notable general of the Sicilian campaigns of the First Punic War
- Gisco, one of three ambassadors sent by Hannibal to King Philip V of Macedon in 215 BC
- Gisgo, a Carthaginian officer at the Battle of Cannae who, noting the great size of the Roman army, provoked Hannibal's retort, "Another thing that has escaped your notice, Gisgo, is even more amazing: That, although there are so many of them, there is not one among them called Gisgo."
- Gisco, a Carthaginian who argued against the peace terms offered by Scipio Africanus after the Battle of Zama in 202 BC
- Gisco, Carthaginian magistrate who opposed negotiations with Rome in 152 BC before the Third Punic War
- Gisco Strytanus, ambassador to Rome in 146 BC

== See also ==
- Hasdrubal Gisco ("Hasdrubal, son of Gisco"; died 202 BC), Carthaginian military commander in the Second Punic War
- Hannibal Gisco ("Hannibal, son of Gisco"; c. 295–260 BC), Carthaginian military commander
