= Hanno the Navigator =

5th-century BC Carthaginian explorer

- Occupations: Explorer, possibly king
- Years active: 5th century BC
- Known for: Naval exploration of the western coast of Africa
- Works: A periplus about his journey
- Family: Magonid

Hanno the Navigator (sometimes "Hannon"; Punic: 𐤇𐤍𐤀, Ḥnʾ; Greek: Ἄννων, romanized: Annōn) was a Carthaginian explorer (sometimes identified as a king) who lived during the fifth century BC, known for his naval expedition along the coast of West Africa.

Historians have attempted to identify specific locations along Hanno's route, based on the periplus. According to some modern analyses, his expedition could have potentially reached as far south as Gabon; still, according to other sources, he could not have sailed much farther than coastal southern Morocco.

== Biography ==
The name of Hanno was given to many Carthaginians. Ancient texts which specifically mention Hanno the Navigator do not provide much in the way of positively identifying him; some authors referred to him as a king, while others referred to him with the Latin words dux (leader, general) or imperator (commander, emperor). The Greek translation of Hanno's periplus account names him a basileus, a term which may be interpreted as "king", but was commonly used for other high-level Carthaginian officials.

The consensus of scholarship places Hanno as living sometime in the 5th century BC, (Note: "Modern scholars are agreed that it is to be placed in the fifth century BC, but a more precise dating is difficult."; "The voyages of Hanno and Himilco were undertaken ... and the general consensus sees in them two members of the Magonid family in the middle of the fifth century ...") identifying him as a member of the aristocratic Magonid family. R.C.C. Law identifies Hanno as the son of Hamilcar I.

== Periplus account ==
Hanno's account, the Periplus (lit. circumnavigation), is one of the few "extant" accounts of ancient exploration penned by the explorer himself; however, the original version, probably written in the Punic language, has been lost, and the only surviving variants of it are Greek-language manuscripts—first translated in the fifth century— which abridged it to 101 lines.

The initial Greek-language abridgement was copied several times by subsequent Greek and Greek-speaking Roman clerks; two remain extant, dating to the 9th and 14th centuries. Conrad Gessner produced the first Latin translation, printed at Zurich in 1559. While these translations contain contradictions and obvious errors, those are probably derived from an original Carthaginian text. Thus, despite its complicated situation, the periplus has survived as "the nearest we have to a specimen of Carthaginian 'literature'".

=== Summary ===
The "Mount Cameroon" interpretation of the route

This summary is based on a translation by Al. N. Oikonomides. The proper names are unchanged from the translation. It reflects the views of the translator and may ignore more widely accepted theories among scholars.

As the work begins, "this is the report of the periplus of Hanno, king of the Carthaginians, into the Libyan areas of the earth beyond the Pillars of Hercules which he dedicated in the sanctuary of Kronos." With 60 ships and 30,000 people, Hanno intends to found cities along the African coast. He first founds one city, then sails some distance and founds five others. (Note: The six cities are named, in the order of the original, Thymiaterion (the first founded), Karikon Teichos, Gytte, Akra, Melitta, and Arambys.) Arriving at a river, the Carthaginians meet the Lixitae, a friendly nomadic tribe. They learn of the nearby Ethiopians, and taking aboard several Lixitae, set sail again. At the small island Kerne, another settlement is built. Around the lake Chretes and an unnamed river, there are savage men and large wild beasts (Note: Hippopotami and crocodiles are the two animals mentioned.) respectively. After returning to Kerne, they sail further south down Africa, finding Ethiopians whose language even the Lixitae interpreters do not understand. Passing further, Hanno finds an "immense opening of the sea", from which fires may be sighted. At a bay called the "Horn of the West", they land on an island where humans live. The Carthaginians hurry away in fear (Note: The text does not record any word about an actual interaction between the Carthaginians and the unnamed people on the island.) and reach lands where there are many flames. A very tall mountain is there. Finally arriving at a bay, the "Horn of the South", there is an island with hostile, hirsute men named "Gorillas" (see § Gorillai). Three of them are killed, their skins brought home to Carthage. Having run out of provisions, they do not sail further. The periplus abruptly ends here without discussing the return journey.

=== Textual criticism ===
Both ancient and modern authors have criticized the work. Most attempts to locate the places described in the periplus based on the reported sailing distances and directions have failed. To make the text more accurate, scholars have tried textual criticism. Ultimately, the Carthaginians probably edited the real account to protect their trade: other countries would not be able to identify the places described, while Carthaginians could still boast about their accomplishments.

Oikonomides theorizes that the hypothetical Punic manuscript that was translated into Greek was incomplete itself: it left out the later parts of the original periplus. The ending of the narrative is abrupt, and it would also have been logically impossible for the expedition to end as described. Therefore, he argues, the final two lines must have been inserted to compensate for an incomplete manuscript.

== Expedition ==
Carthage dispatched Hanno, at the head of a fleet of 60 ships, to explore and colonize the northwestern coast of Africa. He sailed west from Carthage toward the Iberian Peninsula, passing through the Strait of Gibraltar and founding or repopulating seven colonies along the coast of (what is now) Morocco. He then continued at least some distance further south along the continent's Atlantic coast, allegedly encountering various indigenous peoples along his way, who met the fleet with a range of "welcomes".

The gold trade had been a vital foundation of the Carthaginian empire from the fifth century BC, and the desire to secure the gold route to West Africa may have been the original motivation for the exploration of sub-Saharan Africa.

A number of scholars have commented upon Hanno's voyage, stating that, in many cases, the analyses have been to refine information and interpretation of the original account. William Smith points out that the complement of personnel totalled 30,000 men, and that the core mission included the intent to found Carthaginian (or in the older parlance 'Libyophoenician') towns. Other sources have questioned this high number of men, with some suggesting 5,000 to be a more accurate number. R.C.C. Law notes that "It is a measure of the obscurity of the problem that while some commentators have argued that Hanno reached the Gabon area, others have taken him no further than southern Morocco."

Harden reports a consensus that the expedition reached at least as far as Senegal. Due to the vagueness of the Periplus, estimates for the voyage's distance range from under 1,100 kilometres (680 mi) to at least 4,800 kilometres (3,000 mi). Some agree he could have reached Gambia. However, Harden mentions disagreement as to the farthest limit of Hanno's explorations: Sierra Leone, Cameroon, or Gabon. He notes the description of Mount Cameroon, a 4,040-metre (13,250 ft) volcano, more closely matches Hanno's description than Guinea's 890-metre (2,920 ft) Mount Kakoulima. Warmington prefers Mount Kakoulima, considering Mount Cameroon too "distant".

French historian Raymond Mauny, in his 1955 article "La navigation sur les côtes du Sahara pendant l'antiquité", argued that ancient navigators (Hanno, Euthymenes, Scylax, etc.) could not have sailed south along the Atlantic coast much farther than Cape Bojador, in the territory of Western Sahara. Carthage, reportedly, knew of and conducted some trade with the peoples of the Canary Islands; ancient geographers were aware of the archipelago, as well, though nothing further south. Ships with square sails, without a stern rudder, might navigate south, but the winds and currents throughout the year would complicate or prevent the return trip from Senegal to Morocco. Oared ships might be able to achieve the return northward, but only with very great difficulties and a large crew. Mauny assumed that Hanno did not get farther than the mouth of the river Drâa, attributing artifacts found on Mogador Island to the expedition described in the Periplus of Pseudo-Scylax (dated mid-4th century BC) and noting that no evidence of Mediterranean trade further south had yet been found. The author ends by suggesting archaeological investigations of the islands along the coast, such as Cape Verde, or the île de Herné ('Dragon Island', near Dakhla, Western Sahara) where ancient adventurers may have been stranded and settled.

=== Gorillai ===
The end of the periplus describes an island populated with hairy and savage people. Attempts to capture the men failed. Three of the women were taken, but were so ferocious that they were killed, their skins brought home to Carthage. The skins were kept in the Temple of Juno (Tanit or Astarte) on Hanno's return and, according to Pliny the Elder, survived until the Roman destruction of Carthage in 146 BC, some 350 years after Hanno's expedition.

Hanno's interpreters of an African tribe (Lixites or Nasamonians) called the people Gorillai (in Greek, Γόριλλαι). In 1847, the gorilla, an ape species, was scientifically described and named after the Gorillai. The authors did not affirmatively identify Hanno's Gorillai as the gorilla.

== Ancient authors' accounts ==
The text was known to the Roman Pliny the Elder (c. 23–79) and the Greek Arrian of Nicomedia (c. 86–160).

=== Pliny the Elder ===
While the power of Carthage was at its height, Hanno published an account of a voyage which he made from Gades [modern Cádiz] to the extremity of Arabia; Himilco was also sent, about the same time, to explore the remote parts of Europe.

— Pliny the Elder, The Natural History 2.67

Pliny may have recorded the time vaguely because he was ignorant of the actual date. His claim that Hanno completely circumnavigated Africa, reaching Arabia, is considered unrealistic by contemporary scholarship.

=== Arrian ===
Arrian mentions Hanno's voyage at the end of his Anabasis of Alexander VIII (Indica):

Hannon the Libyan set out from Carthage with Libya on his left and sailed out beyond the Pillars of Heracles into the Outer Sea, continuing his voyage then in an easterly direction for a total of thirty-five days: but when he eventually turned south he met a number of crippling obstacles—lack of water, burning heat, streams of lava gushing into the sea.

— Arrian, Indica 43.11–12

=== Herodotus ===
Greek historian Herodotus, writing around 430 BC, described Carthaginian trade on the Moroccan coast (Histories 4.196), though it is doubtful whether he was aware of Hanno's voyage itself.

== Legacy ==
The lunar crater Hanno is named after him.

Singer-songwriter Al Stewart has a song about Hanno on his album Sparks of Ancient Light.

In Sid Meier's Civilization VI, players can recruit Hanno as a Great Admiral.

== Historiography ==
In the 16th century, the voyage of Hanno saw increased scholarly interest from Europeans in an age when European exploration and navigation were flourishing. Already then, the extent of Hanno's voyage was debated.

== Bibliography ==
- Baurian, Claude (2015). "Punic". In Selden, Daniel L.; Vasunia, Phiroze (eds.). The Oxford Handbook of the Literatures of the Roman Empire. Oxford University Press. doi:10.1093/oxfordhb/9780199699445.013.26. ISBN 978-0-19-969944-5 – via Oxford Handbooks Online.
- Bunbury, Edward Herbert (1883) [1879]. A History of Ancient Geography Among the Greeks and Romans. Vol. 1 (2nd ed.). London: John Murray. OCLC 819670798.
- Carpenter, Rhys (1966). Nef, Evelyn Stefansson (ed.). Beyond the Pillars of Heracles: The Classical World Seen through the Eyes of its Discoverers. The Great Explorers. New York: Delacorte Press. OCLC 497693.
- Cary, Max; Warmington, Eric Herbert (1929). The Ancient Explorers. London: Methuen & Co.
- Dugan, Holly (2020). "Renaissance Gorillas". Criticism. 62 (3). Wayne State University Press: 387–410. doi:10.13110/criticism.62.3.0387. S2CID 241956006.
- Harden, Donald Benjamin (1963) [1962]. Daniel, Glyn (ed.). The Phoenicians. Ancient Peoples and Places (2nd ed.). New York: Frederick A. Praeger.
- Hoyos, Dexter (2010). The Carthaginians. Routledge. ISBN 978-0-415-43645-8.
- Huss, Werner (1985). Geschichte der Karthager [History of the Carthaginians]. Handbuch der Altertumswissenschaft (in German). Munich: C. H. Beck. ISBN 978-3-406-30654-9.
- Kroupa, Sebestian (2019). "Humanists and Travellers, Gorgons and Gorillas: Hanno the Navigator's 'Periplus' and Early Modern Geography (1530–1630)" (PDF). International History Review. 41 (4). Routledge: 793–820. doi:10.1080/07075332.2018.1464044. S2CID 213655423. ProQuest 2248796890.
- Law, R. C. C. (1978). "North Africa in the period of Phoenician and Greek colonization, c. 800 to 325 BC". In Fage, John Donnelly; Oliver, Roland Anthony (eds.). The Cambridge History of Africa. Vol. 2. Cambridge University Press. pp. 87–147. ISBN 978-0-521-21592-3.
- Lendering, Jona (2020) [1998]. "Hanno the Navigator". Livius.
- Mauny, Raymond (1955). "La navigation sur les côtes du sahara pendant l'antiquité" [The Navigation on the Coasts of the Sahara during Antiquity]. Revue des Études Anciennes (in French). 57 (1). Bordeaux Montaigne University: 92–101. doi:10.3406/rea.1955.3523.
- Murray, Hugh (1844). An Encyclopædia of Geography (2nd ed.). London: Longman, Brown, Green, and Longmans.
- Oikonomides, Al. N. (1977) [1974]. "Introduction". In Oikonomides, Al. N. (ed.). Periplus, or Circumnavigation (of Africa) (2nd ed.). Chicago: Ares Publishers. pp. 9–21. ISBN 978-0-89005-217-4. OCLC 880515097.
- Savage, Thomas Staughton; Wyman, Jeffries (December 1847). "Notice of the External Characters and Habits of Troglodytes gorilla, a New Species of Orang from the Gaboon River". Boston Journal of Natural History. 5 (4). Boston Society of Natural History: 417–442. BHL page 32267712.
- Schmitz, Leonhard (1867). "Hanno". In Smith, William (ed.). Dictionary of Greek and Roman Biography and Mythology. Vol. 2. Boston: Little, Brown, and Company. pp. 346–347.
- Soren, David; ben Khader, Aicha ben Abed; Slim, Hedi (1991). Carthage. Touchstone Books. Simon & Schuster. ISBN 978-0-671-73289-9.
- Thomson, James Oliver (2013) [1948]. History of Ancient Geography. Cambridge: Cambridge University Press. ISBN 978-1-107-68992-3.
- Warmington, Brian Herbert (1960). Carthage. New York: Frederick A. Praeger.

=== Ancient ===
- Arrian (2013). Alexander the Great: The Anabasis and the Indica. Translated by Hammond, Martin. Oxford World's Classics. ISBN 978-0-19-958724-7.
- Hanno (1977) [1974]. "Periplus". In Oikonomides, Al. N. (ed.). Periplus, or Circumnavigation (of Africa). Translated by Oikonomides, Al. N. (2nd ed.). Chicago: Ares Publishers. pp. 24–29. ISBN 978-0-89005-217-4. OCLC 880515097.
- Herodotus (1920). The Histories. Translated by Godley, Alfred Denis. Cambridge, Mass.: Harvard University Press – via Perseus Digital Library.
- Pliny the Elder (1855). The Natural History. Translated by Bostock, John; Riley, Henry Thomas. London: Taylor and Francis – via Perseus Digital Library.
