= Hasdrubal I of Carthage =

Magonid King of Carthage from 530 BC to 510 BC

Hasdrubal I
- King of Carthage
- Reign: 530 BC to 510 BC
- Predecessor: Mago I
- Successor: Hamilcar I
- Dynasty: Magonids

Hasdrubal I (Punic: 𐤏𐤆𐤓𐤁𐤏𐤋, ʿAzrubaʿal, "Help of Baal") was a Magonid king of Ancient Carthage, a kingdom with its capital, Carthage, located in present-day Tunisia, from 530 to 510 BC.

== Rule ==
In the mid 520s BC, Hasdrubal, along with his brother Hamilcar I, launched an expedition against Sardinia.

Hasdrubal was elected as "King" eleven times, was granted a triumph four times (the only Carthaginian to receive this honour – there is no record of anyone else being honoured to that extent by Carthage) and died of his battle wounds received in Sardinia. Carthage had engaged in a 25-year struggle in Sardinia, where the natives may have received aid from Sybaris, then the richest city in Magna Graecia and an ally of the Phocaeans. The Carthaginians faced resistance from Nora and Sulci in Sardinia, while Carales and Tharros had submitted willingly to Carthaginian rule. Hasdrubal's war against the Libyans failed to stop the annual tribute payment.

Around this time, the Carthaginians managed to defeat and drive away the colonisation attempt near Leptis Magna in Libya by the Spartan prince Dorieus after three years. Dorieus was later defeated and killed at Eryx in Sicily (around 510 BC) while attempting to establish a foothold in Western Sicily.

== See also ==
- Other Hasdrubals in Carthaginian history
