= Hanno I the Great =

Fourth Century BCE Carthaginian statesman

Hanno I the Great (Punic: 𐤇𐤍𐤀, ḥnʾ) was a Carthaginian politician and military leader of the 4th century BC.

The Roman historian Justin calls him princeps Carthaginiensium, prince of the Carthaginians. It is possible that this title signifies "first among equals", rather than a monarchical status. His rival, Suniatus, was called the potentissimus Poenorum, or "the most powerful of the Carthaginians", in the year 368. Several years later, Suniatus was accused of high treason (for correspondence with Syracuse) and probably executed.

In 367, Hanno the Great commanded a fleet of 200 ships which won a decisive naval victory over the Greeks of Sicily. His victory effectively blocked the plans of Dionysius I of Syracuse to attack Lilybaeum, a city in western Sicily allied to Carthage.

For about twenty years, Hanno the Great was the leading figure of Carthage, and perhaps the wealthiest. In the 340s, he schemed to become the tyrant. After distributing food to the populace, the time for a show of force came and he utilized for that purpose the native slaves and a Berber chieftain, plotting to assassinate the entire Carthaginian Senate at a wedding. Hanno was captured, found to be a traitor, and tortured to death. Many members of his family were also put to death.

Later, Hanno's son Gisgo was given the command of seventy ships of Carthage crewed by Greek mercenaries and sent to Lilybaeum, after which peace was negotiated by Carthage with Timoleon of Syracuse (c. 340). Thereafter, this family's prestige and influence at Carthage would tell in later generations. Hanno I was probably an ancestor of Hanno II the Great.

== Bibliography ==
- Charles-Picard, Gilbert; Picard, Colette. Life and Death of Carthage. Taplinger, 1968.
- Huss, Werner. Geschichte der Karthager. C.H. Beck, 1985. ISBN 9783406306549
- Lancel, Serge. Carthage: A History. Blackwell, 1995.
- Warmington, B. H. Carthage. Robert Hale, 1960.
