= Mago I of Carthage =

King of Carthage from 550 BC to 530 BC

Mago I
- King of Carthage
- Reign: 550 BC to 530 BC
- Predecessor: Malchus of Carthage
- Successor: Hasdrubal I of Carthage
- Dynasty: Magonids

Mago I, also known as Magon (Punic: 𐤌𐤂𐤍, mgn), was the king of the Ancient Carthage from 550 BC to 530 BC and the founding monarch of the Magonid dynasty of Carthage. Mago I was originally a general. Under Mago, Carthage became preeminent among the Phoenician colonies in the western Mediterranean.

== Rule ==
Under Mago, Carthage established itself as the dominant Phoenician military power in the western Mediterranean. It remained economically dependent on Tyre, but acted increasingly independently. One of Mago's political achievements was an alliance with the Etruscans against Ancient Greece. This alliance lasted until around the time when Rome expelled the Etruscan kings. He was also active in Sicily.

In 546 BC, Phocaeans fleeing the Persian invasion established Alalia in Corsica (Greeks had been settled there since 562 BC), and began preying on Etruscan and Punic commerce. Between 540 and 535 BC, a Carthaginian-Etruscan alliance had expelled the Greeks from Corsica after the Battle of Alalia. The Etruscans took control of Corsica, and Carthage concentrated on Sardinia, ensuring that no Greek presence would be established in the island. The defeat also ended the westward expansion of the Greeks for all time.

A war with Hellenic Massalia followed. Carthage lost battles but managed to safeguard Phoenician Spain and close the Strait of Gibraltar to Greek shipping, while Massalians retained their Spanish colonies in Eastern Iberia above Cape Nao. Southern Spain was closed to the Greeks. Carthaginians in support of the Phoenician colony of Gades in Spain also brought about the collapse of Tartessos in Spain by 530 BC, either by armed conflict or by cutting off Greek trade. Carthage also besieged and took over Gades at that time. The Persians had taken over Cyrene by then, and Carthage may have been spared a trial of arms against the Persian Empire when the Phoenicians refused to lend ships to Cambyses in 525 BC for an African expedition. Carthage may have paid tribute irregularly to the Great King. It is not known if Carthage had any role in the Battle of Cumae in 524 BC, after which Etruscan power began to wane in Italy.

== See also ==
- Magonid dynasty
