= Battle of Alalia =

Ancient naval battle in the eastern Strait of Bonifacio

Coordinates: 42.1041973°N 9.55267913°E

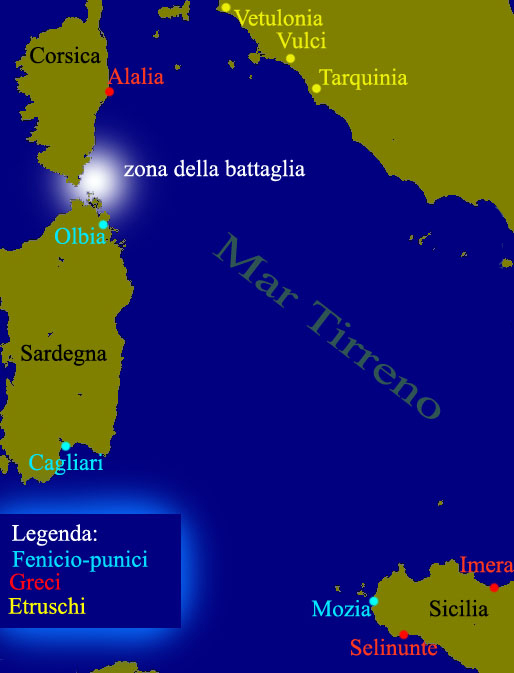
- Map of the Tyrrhenian Sea surrounded by Etruscans, Greeks, and Phoenicians
Date	Some time between 540 BC and 535 BC
Location	Alalia, Corsica
Result	Greek victory
Territorial changes	The Greeks evacuated Corsica, which was captured by the Etruscans; Sardinia under the Carthaginian sphere of influence.

Belligerents
Phocaeans	Etruscans; Carthage

Strength
60 Pentekonters	Around 120 Ships

Casualties and losses
Almost 40 Pentekonters lost; rams of the surviving ships severely damaged.	Unknown

The naval Battle of Alalia took place between 540 BC and 535 BC off the coast of Corsica between Greeks and the allied Etruscans and Carthaginians. A Greek force of 60 Phocaean ships defeated a Punic-Etruscan fleet of 120 ships while emigrating to the western Mediterranean and the nearby colony of Alalia (now Aléria). It was nonetheless, in the words of Herodotus, a cadmean victory (a victory involving one's own ruin) which benefited the Etruscans and Carthaginians.

== Background ==
The Phoenicians had planted trading posts in Africa, Sicily, Sardinia and Iberia during the 9th and 8th centuries BC while creating their trading monopoly. The Phoenicians were among the first peoples, if not the first, to begin trading around the Mediterranean on a wide scale after the period of economic decline that had accompanied the end of the Mediterranean Bronze Age. The Etruscans emerged as a local power in the 8th century BC, spreading their trade to Corsica, Sardinia and Iberia and creating a powerful navy to guard their interests. The Phoenicians and Etruscans became trading partners and rivals, exchanging goods with and engaging in opportunistic raids against each other. The situation changed with the beginning and growth of Greek activity in the western Mediterranean from around 750 BC onward.

=== Greek colonisation of the western Mediterranean ===
The second (quite possibly the third) wave of Greek colonization efforts in this area started with the planting of Cumae in Italy by 750 BC and Naxos in Sicily by 735 BC. Within the next 100 years, several Greek cities had planted colonies along the coast of southern Italy and most of Sicily, creating a position to control trade routes around these areas and dominating the Strait of Messina. Etruscans clashed with the Greeks, but were unable to stop the process. Although the colonization process was not done according to any master plan, with several Greek cities acting simultaneously, it probably seemed to the Phoenicians and Etruscans that a flood of Greeks were drowning the Tyrrhenian seacoast.

The Greek-colonized zone encompassing Sicily and Southern Italy came to be known as Magna Graecia. The Greeks living in this area behaved in a similar way to the mainland Greeks, expanding their political and commercial domain at the expense of their neighbors while keeping the Ionian–Dorian feud alive. The colonization offered greater opportunities for increased trade, piracy and other conflicts among the Etruscans, Phoenicians and Greeks competing for control of seaborne trade of the area.

=== Carthaginian hegemony ===
Carthage created her hegemony in part to resist Greek encroachments in the Phoenician sphere of influence. Phoenicians initially (750–650 BC) did not resist the Greeks, but after the Greeks had returned to Iberia sometime after 638 BC, being virtually absent for at least two centuries, Carthage emerged as the leader of the Phoenician resistance. During the 6th century BC, mostly under the leadership of the Magonid dynasty, Carthage established an empire which would commercially dominate the Western Mediterranean. The Phoenician cities of Motya, Panormus and Solus in Sicily and the Elymians had teamed up to defeat the Greeks of Selinus and Rhodes near Lilybaeum in 580 BC, the first such recorded incident in Sicily. These cities remained independent until becoming part of the Carthaginian hegemony after 540 BC.

== Prelude: Phocaeans ==
The Phocaean Greeks from Asia Minor (modern Turkey) had founded the colony of Massalia around 600 BC, which the Carthaginians had tried and failed to prevent. Massalia became a thriving trading center and a major rival of Carthage for the Spanish markets and the tin trade through Gaul. The Phocaeans also planted a colony in Alalia on Corsica around 562 BC. When the city of Phocaea itself fell to Cyrus the Great of Persia in 546 BC, most Phoceans moved to Alalia, partly because they were on good terms with the Greek colonies along the Strait of Messina and had even been granted toll-free passage. Later, after the battle, in 540 BC, they founded Elea in southern Italy (Magna Grecia).

The Phocaeans had managed to establish their base at a time when Carthage was engaged in defending Punic colonies in Sicily (Greeks had started to encroach on Punic cities in 580 BC) and conquering territory in Sardinia, Tyre was facing Persian domination and the Etruscans were engaged in expansion across Italy, starting with the formation of the Etruscan League. The Greeks started to prey on Carthaginian and Etruscan trade from Corsica, which continued unchecked for five years. However, fearing that the Greeks would threaten their colonies in North Italy and Sardinia next, the Etruscans and Carthaginians joined forces to oppose the Greeks around 540 BC. It is not known if the Carthaginians had allied with the Etruscan League or with individual Etruscan cities.

== Battle ==
It is assumed that the Phocaean Greeks had 60 pentekonters (ships with 48 oars and two rudders for steering), not the trireme that would become famous at the Battle of Salamis, and the allied fleet was twice as large, also composed of pentekonters. Details of the battle are sketchy, but it is known that although the Greeks had driven the allied fleet off, they had lost almost two-thirds of their own fleet in doing so: a Cadmean victory, according to Herodotus. The rams of the surviving ships had been severely damaged. Realizing that they could not withstand another attack, the Greeks evacuated Corsica, and initially sought refuge in Rhegion in Italy. Carthaginian and Etruscan battle losses are not known. A legend describes how Greek prisoners were stoned to death at Caere by the Etruscans, while the Carthaginians sold their prisoners into slavery. This battle is also known as "The Battle of Sardinia Sea".

== Aftermath ==
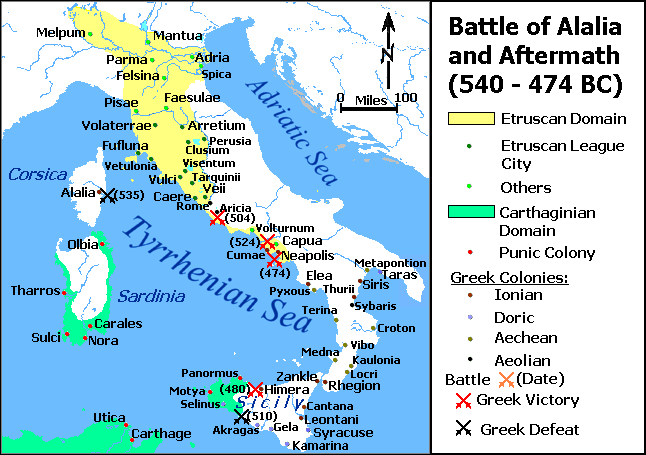
Battle of Alalia and aftermath

Corsica passed into Etruscan hands, while Carthage retained Sardinia. Carthage would fight two more major naval battles with Massalia, losing both, but still managing to close the Strait of Gibraltar to Greek shipping and thus containing the Greek expansion in Spain by 480 BC. Attempts by Etruscans to conquer Greek areas in Southern Italy would be opposed by the Greek city of Cumae. They would defeat an Etruscan invasion in 524 BC. Carthage would defeat the attempt of Spartan prince Dorieus to colonize North Africa (c. 513 BC) and Western Sicily (c. 510 BC). While Carthage was busy in Sardinia after 509 BC dealing with a native uprising, the Greek city of Syracuse under Gelon, allied with the Greek city of Agrigentum under Theron to challenge the Carthaginians in Sicily.

That set the stage for the Sicilian Wars (480–307 BC) between Carthage and the Greeks. According to Herodotus, it was only after the battle that Phocaeans moved to Italy where they founded Elea.

Some authors consider that the Greek defeat and consequent lack of Greek traders in the Gibraltar Strait led to the collapse of the Tartessian civilization in Southern Spain, while the Punic presence remained undisturbed. The uncontested, and more lucrative, river trade with the interior of Gaul became the focal point of the Greek cities of modern southern France, such as Massalia (modern Marseille).
