= Hamilcar I of Carthage =

Magonid king of Carthage from 510 to 480 BC

Hamilcar I
- King of Carthage
- Reign: 510 BC to 480 BC
- Predecessor: Hasdrubal I
- Successor: Hanno II
- Dynasty: Magonids

Hamilcar I (Punic: 𐤇𐤌𐤋𐤊, ḥmlk) was a Magonid king of Carthage in present-day Tunisia from 510 to 480 BC.

== Rule ==
=== Treaty with Rome ===
Carthage concluded treaties with several states, most notably with Rome. Signed in 509 BC, the treaty formalized a division of influence and commercial activities. This treaty is the first known source suggesting that Carthage had gained control over Sicily and Sardinia, as well as Emporia and the area south of Cape Bon in Africa. Carthage may have signed the treaty with Rome, then an insignificant backwater, because Romans had treaties with the Phocaeans and Cumae, who were aiding the Roman struggle against the Etruscans at that time. Carthage had similar treaties with Etruscan, Punic and Greek cities in Sicily.

By the end of the 6th Century BC, Carthage had conquered most of the old Phoenician colonies e.g. Hadrumetum, Utica and Kerkouane, subjugated some of the Libyan tribes, and had taken control of parts of the North African coast from modern Morocco to the borders of Cyrenaica. It was also fighting wars to defend its Punic colonies and commerce. However, only the details of her struggle against the Greeks have survived, which has led to the impression that Carthage seemed "obsessed with Sicily".

=== First Sicilian War ===
The island of Sicily, lying at Carthage's doorstep, became the arena on which this conflict played out. From their earliest days, both the Greeks and Phoenicians had been attracted to the large island, establishing a large number of colonies and trading posts along its coasts. Small battles had been fought between these settlements for decades. Carthage had to respond to at least three Greek incursions, in 580 BC, in 510 BC (involving Dorieus the Spartan, brother of Cleomenes I) and, according to Diodorus Siculus, a war in which the city of Heraclea Minoa was destroyed.

The Punic domain in Sicily by 500 BC contained the cities of Motya, Panormus and Soluntum. By 490 BC, Carthage had concluded treaties with the Greek cities of Selinus, Himera, and Zankle in Sicily. Gelo, the tyrant of Greek Syracuse, backed in part by support from other Greek city-states, was attempting to unite the island under his rule since 485 BC. When Theron of Akragas, father in law of Gelo, deposed the tyrant of Himera in 483 BC, Carthage decided to intervene at the instigation of the tyrant of Rhegion, who was the father-in-law of the deposed tyrant of Himera.

Hamilcar prepared the largest Punic overseas expedition to date and after three years of preparations, sailed for Sicily. This enterprise coincided with the expedition of Xerxes against mainland Greece in 480 BC, prompting speculation about a possible alliance between Carthage and Persia against the Greeks, although no firm evidence of this exists. The Punic fleet was battered by storms en route, and the Punic army was destroyed and Hamilcar killed in the Battle of Himera by the combined armies of Himera, Akragas and Syracuse under Gelo. Carthage made peace with the Greeks and paid a large indemnity of 2000 silver talents, but lost no territory in Sicily.

== Weakening of kings ==
This defeat had far reaching consequences, both political and economic, for Carthage. Politically, the old government of entrenched nobility was ousted, replaced by the Carthaginian Republic. Kings were still elected, but their power began to erode, with the senate and the "Tribunal of 104" gaining dominance in political matters, and the position of Suffet becoming more influential. Economically, sea-borne trade with the Middle East was cut off by the mainland Greeks and Magna Graecia boycotted Carthaginian traders. This led to the development of trade with the West and of caravan-borne trade with the East. Gisco, son of Hamilcar was exiled, and Carthage for the next 70 years made no recorded forays against the Greeks nor aided either the Elymians/Sicels or the Etruscans (then locked in struggles against the Greeks) or sent any aid to the Greek enemies of Syracuse, then the leading Greek city in Sicily. Based on this absence from Greek affairs, it has been suggested that Carthage was militarily crippled for some time after the defeat at Himera.

== See also ==
- Other Hamilcars in Carthaginian history
