= Punic language =

Extinct ancient Phoenician language

Punic
- Phoenicio-Punic, Carthaginian, Western Tyro-Sidonian
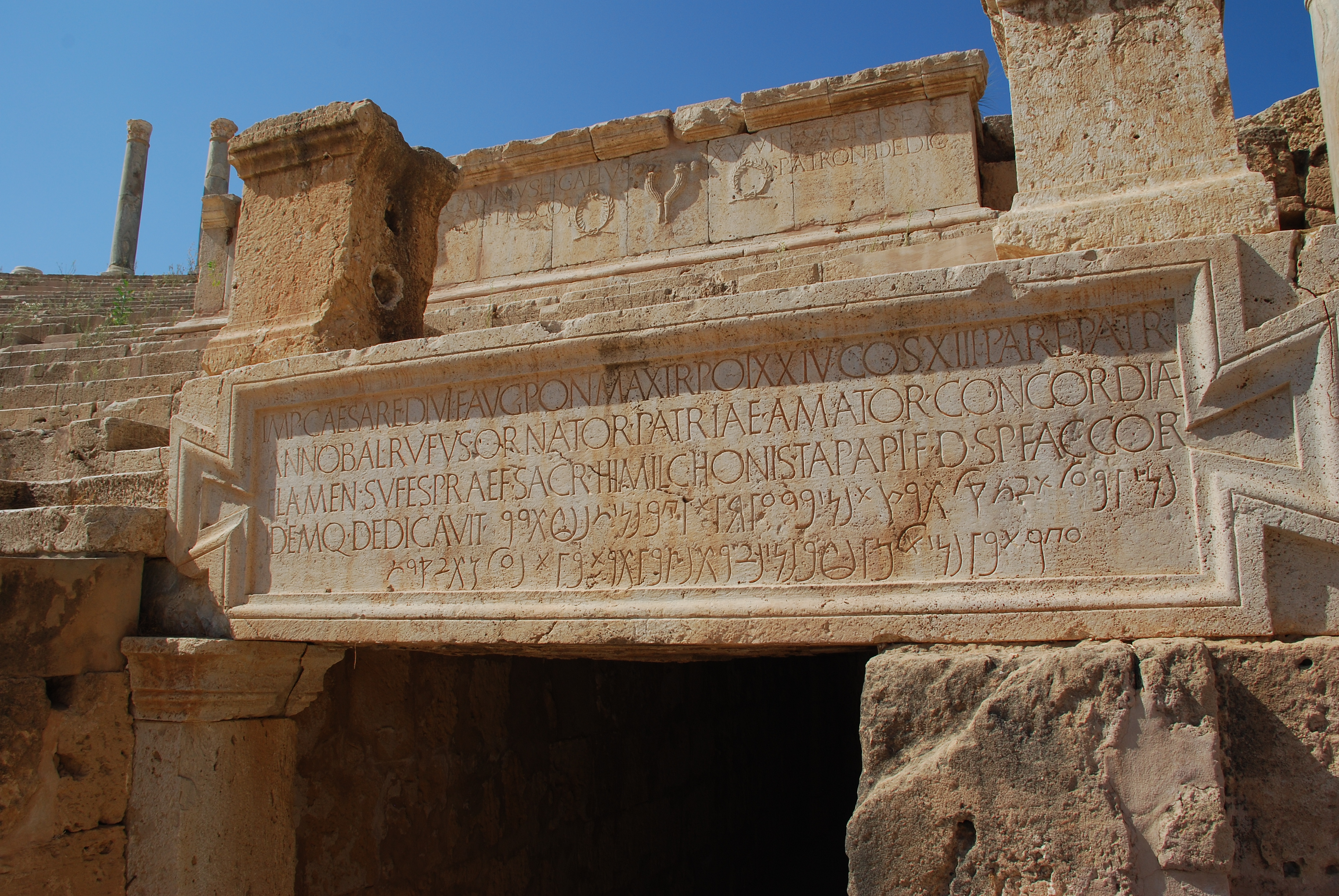
- One of the Tripolitania Punic inscriptions, in both Latin (top) and Punic (bottom) script.
- Region: Tunisia, coastal parts of Algeria, Morocco, southern Iberia, Balearic islands, Libya, Malta, western Sicily, southern and eastern Sardinia
- Era: 8th century BC to 6th century AD
- Language family: Afro-Asiatic: Semitic; West Semitic; Central Semitic; Northwest Semitic; Canaanite; North; Phoenician; Tyro-Sidonian; Western; Punic
- Early form: Phoenician
- Writing system: Phoenician alphabet

Language codes
- ISO 639-3: xpu
- Glottolog: puni1241 neop1239 Neo-Punic

The Punic language, also called Phoenicio-Punic or Carthaginian, is an extinct variety of the Phoenician language, a Canaanite language of the Northwest Semitic branch of the Semitic languages. An offshoot of the Phoenician language of coastal West Asia (modern Lebanon and north western Syria), it was principally spoken on the Mediterranean coast of Northwest Africa, the Iberian Peninsula and several Mediterranean islands, such as Malta, Sicily, and Sardinia by the Punic people, or western Phoenicians, throughout classical antiquity, from the 8th century BC to the 6th century AD.

== History ==
=== Early history ===
Punic is considered to have gradually separated from its Phoenician parent around the time that Carthage became the leading Phoenician city under Mago I, but scholarly attempts to delineate the dialects lack precision and generally disagree on the classification.

The Punics stayed in contact with the homeland of Phoenicia until the destruction of Carthage by the Roman Republic in 146 BC. At first, there was not much difference between Phoenician and Punic. Developments in the language before 146 BC are largely hidden from us by the adherence of Carthaginian scribes to a traditional Phoenician orthography, but there are occasional hints that the phonology and grammar of Punic had begun to diverge from Phoenician after the sixth century BC. The clearest evidence for this comes from Motya in western Sicily, but there are also traces of it in sixth-century Carthaginian inscriptions and it is unclear whether these developments began in western Sicily and spread to Africa or vice versa. From the fifth-century BC, a shared set of alphabetic, orthographic, and phonological rules are encountered in Punic inscriptions throughout the western Mediterranean, probably due to Carthaginian influence.

Punic literary works were written in the period before 146 BC. For example, Mago wrote 28 volumes about animal husbandry. The Roman Senate appreciated the works so much that after taking Carthage, they presented them to Berber princes who owned libraries there. Mago's work was translated into Greek by Cassius Dionysius of Utica. A Latin version was probably translated from the Greek version. Further examples of Punic works of literature include the works of Hanno the Navigator, who wrote about his encounters during his naval voyages around what is today Africa and about the settling of new colonies in Iberia, North Africa, and the Mediterranean.

=== Neo-Punic ===
Neo-Punic is the cursive version of the Phoenician script that superseded the earlier writing system from around the time of the fall of Carthage in 146 BC until at least the second century AD, and the variety of Punic that was used during this period and later. The dialect differed from the earlier Punic, with some sound changes and grammatical changes reflected in the spelling. These dialectal changes were accompanied by the spread of Punic among the northern Berber peoples. Accordingly, the use of non-Semitic names, mostly of Libyco-Berber or Iberian origin, is characteristic of Neo-Punic inscriptions. Sallust (86 – 34 BC) claims Punic was "altered by their intermarriages with the Numidians". That account agrees with other evidence found to suggest a North African Berber influence on Punic, such as Libyco-Berber names in the Onomasticon of Eusebius. Neo-Punic is mostly known from inscriptions, including Lepcis Magna N 19 (= KAI 124; 92 AD).

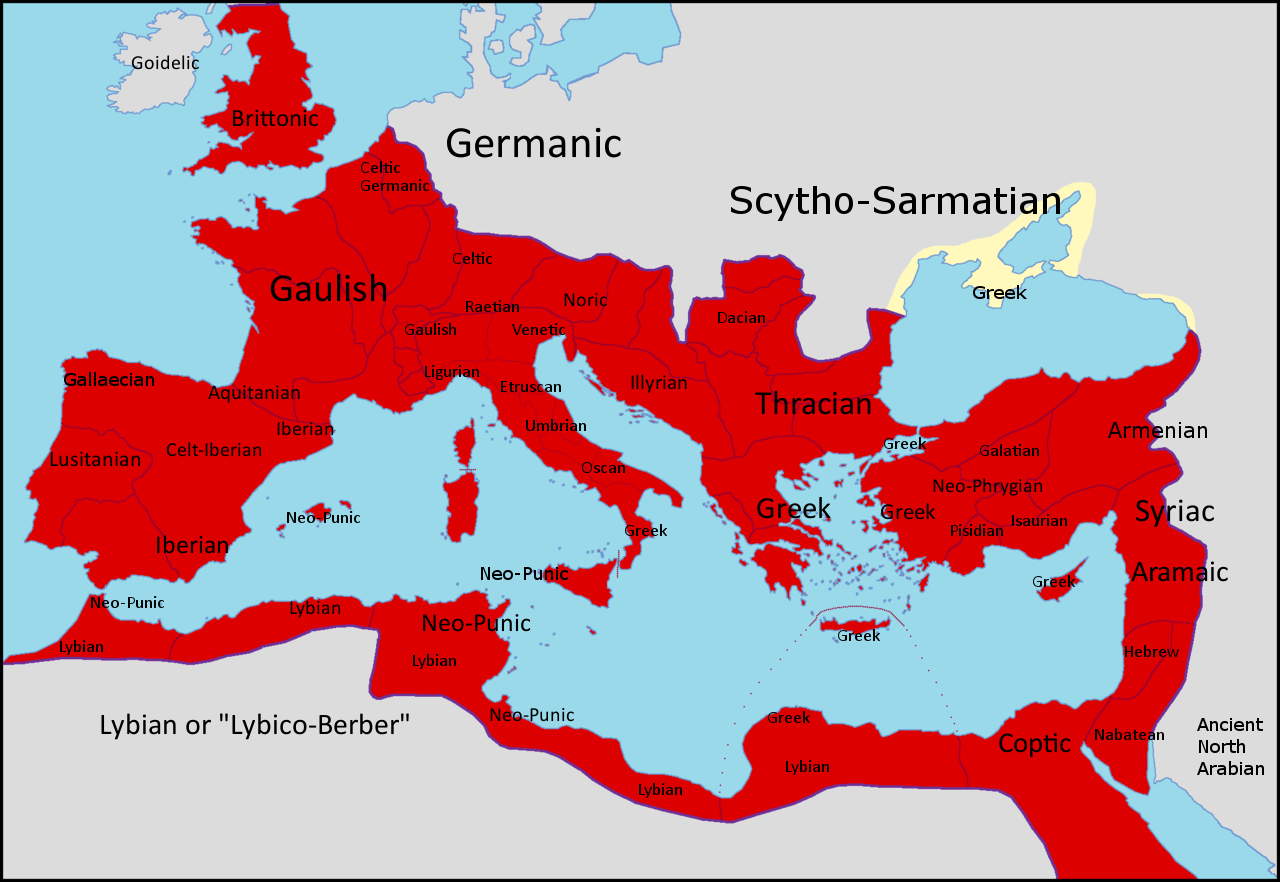
Map of the regional languages of the Roman Empire c. 150 AD

Around the fourth century AD, Punic was still spoken in what is now northern parts of Tunisia and Algeria, other parts of Northwest Africa, and the Mediterranean. A version of Punic known as Latino-Punic was written in the Latin alphabet. It is known from seventy texts from second- to fourth-century Tripolitania and Sirte, such as the first-century Zliten LP1, the second-century Lepcis Magna LP1, and the fourth-century Bir ed-Dreder LP2. Augustine of Hippo (d. 430) is generally considered the last major ancient writer to have some knowledge of Punic and is considered the "primary source on the survival of [late] Punic". According to him, Punic was still spoken in his region (Northern Africa) in the 5th century, centuries after the fall of Carthage, and there were still people who called themselves "chanani" ("Canaanite") at that time. He wrote around 401:

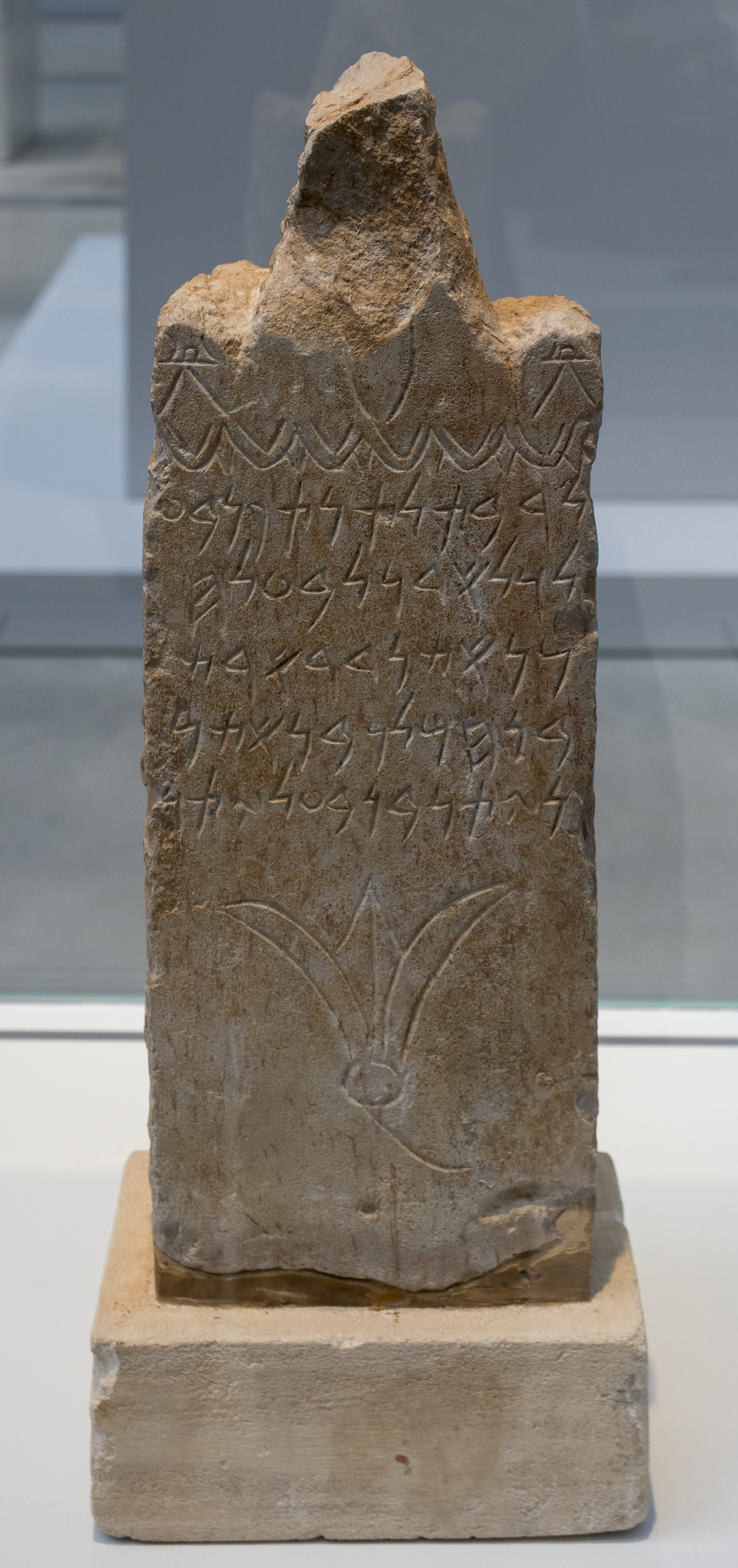
Votive stele with Punic inscription and lotus flower (814 – 1 BC) “To Lady Tanit and Lord Baal Hammon, what Arish, son of Hamilk, vowed…” Louvre Museum

And if the Punic language is rejected by you, you virtually deny what has been admitted by most learned men, that many things have been wisely preserved from oblivion in books written in the Punic tongue. Nay, you [referring to his Pagan interlocutor] ought even to be ashamed of having been born in the country in which the cradle of this language is still warm.

Besides Augustine, the only proof of Punic-speaking communities at such a late period is a series of trilingual funerary texts found in the Christian catacombs of Sirte, Libya: the gravestones are carved in Ancient Greek, Latin and Punic. It might have even survived the Muslim conquest of the Maghreb, as the geographer al-Bakri describes a people speaking a language that was not Berber, Latin or Coptic in Sirte, where spoken Punic survived well past written use. However, it is likely that Arabization of Punic speakers was facilitated by their language belonging to the same group (both were Semitic languages) as that of the conquerors and so they had many grammatical and lexical similarities.

=== Legacy ===
The idea that Punic was the origin of Maltese was first raised in 1565. Modern linguistics has proved that Maltese is in fact derived from Arabic, probably Siculo-Arabic specifically, with a large number of loanwords from Italian. However, Punic was indeed spoken on the island of Malta at some point in its history, as evidenced by both the Cippi of Melqart, which is integral to the decipherment of Punic after its extinction, and other inscriptions that were found on the islands. Punic itself, being Canaanite, was more similar to Biblical Hebrew than to Arabic.

Today there are a number of common Berber roots that descend from Punic, including the word for "learn" (*almid, *yulmad; compare Hebrew למד).

== Evidence ==
Punic is known from inscriptions (most of them religious formulae), personal name evidence, and words in Latin and Greek sources. The play Poenulus by Plautus contains a few lines of vernacular Punic, which are especially noteworthy because they preserve the vowels, unlike inscriptions in the Phoenician alphabet.

Like its Phoenician parent, Punic was written from right to left, in horizontal lines, without vowels.

== Phonology ==
=== Consonants ===
Punic has 22 consonants. Details of their pronunciation can be reconstructed from Punic and Neo-Punic texts written in Latin or Greek characters (inscriptions, and parts of Plautus's comedy Poenulus, 'The Little Punic').

Orthography			Name	Transliteration	Pronunciation	Notes
Neo-Punic	Phoenician		Name	Transliteration	Pronunciation	Notes
Aleph	Aleph	𐤀	ʾalp later ʾalf	ʾ	/ʔ/	Sometimes also used for the indication of vowels.
Beth	Beth	𐤁	Bēt later Vēt	b v	/b/ /v/	In Late Punic and in Late Phoenician, ⟨𐤁⟩ (/b/) underwent a fricativization to ⟨v⟩ (/v/) in the 3rd century BCE.
Gimel	Gimel	𐤂	Gaml	g	/ɡ/	Some words in Latin transliterations show a spirantization as [ɣ] at the end of the word, written indicated by "ẖ" instead of the usual "gh".
Daleth	Daleth	𐤃	Dalt	d	/d/	
He	He	𐤄	Hē	h	/h/	Under Roman influence often elided but was still pronounced in certain Carthaginian words.
Waw	Waw	𐤅	Waw	w	/w/	Sometimes also used for the indication of the vowel "u".
Zayin	Zayin	𐤆	Zēn	z	/z/	In a few names attested as "sd", like in Hasdrubal for "ʿazrubaʿl", "esde" for heze ("this", used in some Punic dialects), but most texts show a simple "s": "syt" for zut ("this", in Late Punic)
Heth	Heth	𐤇	Ḥēt	ḥ	/ħ/	Sometimes used as a vowel for "a, e, i, o, u", the sound of Het was weakened, and words written usually with it were often instead written with the letter Alf in Late Punic inscriptions.
Teth	Teth	𐤈	Ṭēt	ṭ	/tˤ/	
Yodh	Yodh	𐤉	Yod	y	/j/	Sometimes also used for the indication of the vowel "i" but mostly in foreign names.
Kaph	Kaph	𐤊	Kap	k	/k/	Some words in Latin transliterations show a spirantization as [x] at the end of the word, written indicated by "h" instead of the usual "ch".
Lamedh	Lamedh	𐤋	Lamd	l	/l/	
Mem	Mem	𐤌	Mēm	m	/m/	
Nun	Nun	𐤍	Nūn	n	/n/	
Samekh	Samekh	𐤎	Semk	s	/s/	
Ayin	Ayin	𐤏	ʿēn	ʿ	/ʕ/	Often used for the vowel "a" and "o" in late Punic, mostly for foreign Latin names.
Pe	Pe	𐤐	Pi later Fi	p f	/p/ /f/	In Late Punic and in Late Phoenician, ⟨𐤐⟩ (/p/) underwent a fricativization to ⟨f⟩ (/f/) in the 3rd century BCE. (similar to the fricativization that happened to the corresponding Arabic ⟨ف⟩ /f/).
Tsadi	Sadek	𐤑	Tsadē	ṣ	/sˤ/	Attested as "ts" mostly as "s" in Latin and Ancient Greek and Hittite, Lydian and Etruscan texts. Attested in some Latin texts as "st".
Qoph	Qoph	𐤒	Qop later Qof	q	/q/	
Res	Res	𐤓	Rūš	r	/r/	
Shin	Shin	𐤔	Shin	š	/ʃ/ or /s/	Pronunciation is debated: some think it was /ʃ/; others that it was /s/.
Taw	Taw	𐤕	Taw	t	/t/	

==== Table ====
	Labial		Alveolar			Palatal / Velar		Uvular / Pharyngeal		Glottal
	Labial		plain		emphatic	Palatal / Velar		Uvular / Pharyngeal		Glottal
Nasal		m		n						
Stop	p~f	b~v	t	d	tˤ	k	ɡ	q		ʔ
Fricative	p~f	b~v	s	z	sˤ	ʃ		ħ	ʕ	h
Approximant		w		l			j			
Trill				r						

=== Vowels ===
The vowels in Punic and Neo-Punic are: short a, i, and u; their long counterparts ā, ī, and ū; and ē and ō, which had developed out of the diphthongs ay and aw, respectively (for example Punic mēm, 'water', corresponds to Hebrew mayim).

Two vowel changes are noteworthy. In many cases a stressed long ā developed into /o/, for example in the third person masculine singular of the suffixing conjugation of the verb, baròk, 'he has blessed' (compare Hebrew beràk). And in some cases that /o/ secondarily developed into ū, for example mū, 'what?', < mō < mā (cf. Hebrew māh, 'what?').

In late Punic and Neo-Punic the glottal stop and pharyngeal and laryngeal consonants were no longer pronounced. The signs’, ‘, h, and ḥ thus became available to indicate vowels. The ‘ayn (‘) came to be regularly used to indicate an /a/ sound, and also y and w increasingly were used to indicate /i/ and /o, u/, respectively. But a consistent system to write vowels never developed.

== Grammar ==
The notation "XX (xxxx)" is used, where XX is the spelling in Punic characters (without vowels), while xxxx is a phonetic rendering, including vowels, as can be reconstructed from Punic language texts written in the Latin or Greek alphabets.

=== Nouns ===
Nouns, including adjectives, in Punic and Neo-Punic can be of two genders (masculine or feminine), three numbers (singular, dual, or plural), and in two 'states', the absolute state or the so-called construct state. A word in the construct state has a close relation with the word that follows, a relation that is often translated by "of". For example, in the combination "sons of Hanno", "sons of" would be in the construct state, while "Hanno" would be in the absolute state.

Morphology:

		masculine	(example)	feminine	(examples)	
Singular	absolute state	-Ø	BN (bin), 'son'	-T, -’T (-ot, -ut, -īt)	BT (bit), 'daughter'	
Singular	construct state	-Ø	BN (bin), 'son of'	-T, -’T (-ot, -ut, -īt)	BT, B‘T (bit), 'daughter of'	
Dual	absolute state	-M (-ēm)		-M (-ēm)		[YD, 'hand':] YDM (yadēm), 'two hands'
Dual	construct state	-Ø (-ē)		-Ø (-ē)		[‘YN, ‘N, 'eye':] ‘N (‘ēnē), '[two] eyes of'
Plural	absolute state	-M, -’M, -YM (-īm, -ēm)	BNM (banīm), 'sons'	-T, -’T (-ūt)	BNT (banūt), 'daughters'	
Plural	construct state	-Ø (-ē)	BN’ (b^{e}nē), 'sons of'	-T, -’T (-ūt)	BNT (banūt), 'daughters of'	

=== Pronouns ===
==== Demonstrative pronoun ====
The demonstrative pronoun 'this, these' was:

	Masculine	Feminine		
Singular	Z, ’Z, (^{e}zdē);	Z (^{e}zdō);	(Punic)	(cf. Hebrew zèh, fem. zōt)
Singular	S (si); ST (sit)	Š’ (sō, sū); ST (sōt)	(Neo-Punic)	(cf. Hebrew zèh, fem. zōt)
Plural	’L, ’L’ (’llē)		(Punic and Neo-Punic)	(cf. Hebrew ’ēllèh)

===== Definite article =====
The definite article was evolving from Phoenician ha- to an unaspirated article a-. By 406 BCE, both variants were attested in the same inscription (CIS I 5510). Although in later times the h- was no longer pronounced, the "historical" spelling H- kept being used, in addition to ’- and Ø-, and one even finds Ḥ-.

==== Personal pronoun ====
The personal pronouns, when used on their own, are: (forms between [...] are attested in Phoenician only)

	Singular				Plural			
	masculine	feminine		(cf. Hebrew:)	masculine	feminine		(cf. Hebrew:)
1st person	’NK, ’NKY (’anīki, ’anīk)		= 'I, I myself'	’ānokí	[ (’)NḤN ((’a)náḥnu) ]		= 'we'	’anáḥnū
2nd person	’T (’átta)	[ ’T (’atti) ]	= 'you' (singular)	’attā(h); ’at	’TM (’attím)	?	= 'you' (plural)	’attèm; ’attēn
3rd person	H’ (hū, ū)	H’, HY (hī)	= 'he, she'	hū; hī	HMT (hēmat?)		= 'they'	hēmmā(h); hēnnā(h)

When used as a direct or indirect object ('me, him', 'to me, to him') or as a possessive ('mine, his') the personal pronoun takes the form of a suffix. These suffixes can be combined with verbal forms, substantives, and particles.

Examples:

ḤN (ḥan) = (verb:) 'he has shown favor' →

ḤN’ (ḥannō) = 'he has shown favor to him (-ō)' = proper name Hanno
ḤNYB‘L (ḥannī ba‘al) = (verb:) 'Ba‘al has shown favor to me (-ī)' = proper name Hannibal

BN (bin) = 'son' →

BN’, BNY (binō) = 'his son'

’T (’et) = 'with' (preposition) →

’TY (’ittī) = 'together with me'

The paradigm for the suffixed personal pronouns is:

		Singular				Plural			
		masculine	feminine		(cf. Hebrew:)	masculine	feminine		(cf. Hebrew:)
1st person	(possessive)	-Y (-ī)		= 'mine'	-ī	-N (-en, -on)		= 'us, our'	-nû
1st person	(object)	-NY (-ni)		= 'me'	-ni	-N (-en, -on)		= 'us, our'	-nû
2nd person		-K, -K’ (-ka)	-KY, -K (-kī)	= '(to) you, your' (singular)	-ka; -k	-KM (-kom)	?	= '(to) you, your' (plural)	-kem
3rd person		-’, -‘, -‘’ (-o); -Ø, -Y, -Y’ (-yo)	-’, -‘, -‘’ (-a); -Y‘ (-ya)	= 'him, his; her'	-o; -āh	-M (-om);	-M (-am)	= 'them, their'	-ām, -ēm; -ān
3rd person		-Ø, -Y, -’, -’Y (-i) [< -ih(u)]	-Y (-i)	= 'him, his; her'	-hu; -hā	-NM, -N’M, -NHM (-nom)		= 'them, their'	-ām, -ēm; -ān
3rd person		-M (-im)		= 'him, his; her'	—	-NM, -N’M, -NHM (-nom)		= 'them, their'	-ām, -ēm; -ān

==== Relative pronoun ====
The relative pronoun, 'who, that, which', in both Punic and Neo-Punic is’ Š (’īs). In late Neo-Punic M’ (mū) (originally an interrogative pronoun, 'what?') emerged as a second relative pronoun. Both pronouns were not inflected. The combination ’Š M’ (’īs mū) was also used in late Neo-Punic.

==== Determinative pronoun ====
A pronoun Š- (si-) was used to express an indirect genitival relationship between two substantives; it can be translated as 'of'. This uninflected pronoun was prefixed to the second of the two substantives. Example:

HKHNT ŠRBTN (ha-kohènet si-Rabat-ēn), 'the priestess of our Lady'

==== Interrogative pronoun ====
There are two interrogative pronouns:

MY (mī), 'who?' (cf. Hebrew mī)
M’ (mū), 'what?' (cf. Hebrew māh). In Neo-Punic this pronoun is also used as a relative pronoun, 'that, which'.

Neither of the two pronouns was inflected.

==== Indefinite pronoun ====
In Punic and Neo-Punic there was no exclusive indefinite pronoun. Whenever such a pronoun might be needed, it was circumscribed by means of words like ’ḤD (’ḥḥad), 'one', ’Š (’īs) or ’DM (’adom), 'a man, a person', or KL (kil), 'all'.

=== Verbs ===
==== Morphology ====
The nucleus of Punic and Neo-Punic verbs is a "root" consisting of three or, sometimes, two consonants. By adding prefixes and suffixes, and by varying the vowels that are inserted into the root, the various forms of the verb are formed. These belong to six "stems" (conjugations). The basic, and most common, stem type is the Qal. The other common stems are:

- Niph‘al (the usual passive stem);
- Pi‘el (a so-called intensive stem);
- Yiph‘il (a causative stem; corresponds to the Hiph‘il stem in Hebrew).

A few other stems are found only very rarely:

- Qal Passive;
- Pu‘al (passive of the Pi‘el stem);
- Yitpe‘el (reflexive variant of the Pi‘el; Hebrew Hitpa‘el).

===== Qal =====
The paradigm of the Qal is (the verb B-R-K (barok), 'to bless', is used as an example):

(note 1:) barok literally means 'he blessed'; it is tradition to consider the 3rd person masculine suffixing form as the standard form of the Punic verb.
(note 2:) Forms between [...] are known from Phoenician but have not yet been attested in Punic.
(note 3:) The Hebrew verb of the same meaning given for comparison, בֵּרֵךְ berekh, is a Pi’el verb.

Form				(Neo-)Punic	Translation	(cf. Hebrew)
Perfect (Suffixing form)	Singular	1		BRKT (barakti)	= 'I bless'	beràkti
Perfect (Suffixing form)	Singular	2	masc.	BRKT (barakta)	= 'you (m.) bless'	berákta
Perfect (Suffixing form)	Singular	2	fem.	[ BRKT (barakti) ]	= 'you (f.) bless'	berákt
Perfect (Suffixing form)	Singular	3	masc.	BRK (barok)	= 'he blesses'	berek~berák
Perfect (Suffixing form)	Singular	3	fem.	BRK, BRK’, BRK‘ (berka)	= 'she blesses'	berkāh
Perfect (Suffixing form)	Plural	1		BRKN (baraknu)	= 'we bless'	beràknū
Perfect (Suffixing form)	Plural	2	masc.	BRKTM (b^{i}raktim)	= 'you (m. pl.) bless'	beraktèm
Perfect (Suffixing form)	Plural	2	fem.	— (not attested)	'you (f.) bless'	beraktèn
Perfect (Suffixing form)	Plural	3		BRK (barkū)	= 'they bless'	berkū
Imperfect (Prefixing form A) and Iussive (Prefixing form B)	Singular	1		’BRK (’ebrok, ’ibrok)	= 'I will bless, let me bless'	’ávàrek
Imperfect (Prefixing form A) and Iussive (Prefixing form B)	Singular	2	masc.	TBRK (tibrok)	= 'you (m.) will bless, may you (m.) bless'	t^{e}vàrek
Imperfect (Prefixing form A) and Iussive (Prefixing form B)	Singular	2	fem.	[ TBRKY (tibrokī) ]	= 'you (f.) will bless, may you (f.) bless'	t^{e}vàrkī
Imperfect (Prefixing form A) and Iussive (Prefixing form B)	Singular	3	masc.	YBRK (yibrok)	= 'he will bless, may he bless'	y^{e}vàrek
Imperfect (Prefixing form A) and Iussive (Prefixing form B)	Singular	3	fem.	[ TBRK (tibrok) ]	= 'she will bless, may she bless'	t^{e}vàrek
Imperfect (Prefixing form A) and Iussive (Prefixing form B)	Plural	1		NBRK (nibrok)	= 'we will bless, let us bless'	n^{e}vàrek
Imperfect (Prefixing form A) and Iussive (Prefixing form B)	Plural	2	masc.	TBRKN (tibrakūn)	= 'you (m. pl.) will bless' (imperfect)	t^{e}vàrkū
Imperfect (Prefixing form A) and Iussive (Prefixing form B)	Plural	2	masc.	TBRK (tibrokū)	= 'may you (m. pl.) bless' (iussive)	t^{e}vàrkū
Imperfect (Prefixing form A) and Iussive (Prefixing form B)	Plural	2	fem.	YBRK (yibrok)	= 'you (f. pl.) will bless, may you (f.) bless'	t^{e}vàreknāh
Imperfect (Prefixing form A) and Iussive (Prefixing form B)	Plural	3	masc.	[ YBRKN (yibrokūn) ]	= 'they (m.) will bless' (imperfect)	y^{e}vàrkū
Imperfect (Prefixing form A) and Iussive (Prefixing form B)	Plural	3	masc.	YBRK (yibrokū)	= 'may they (m.) bless' (iussive)	y^{e}vàrkū
Imperfect (Prefixing form A) and Iussive (Prefixing form B)	Plural	3	fem.	— (not attested)	'they (f.) will bless, may they (f.) bless'	t^{e}vàreknāh
Cohortative (Prefixing form C)	Singular	1		— (not attested)	'let me bless!'	’ávàrekāh
Cohortative (Prefixing form C)	Plural	1		— (not attested)	'let us bless!'	n^{e}vàrekāh
Imperative	Singular	2	masc.	BRK (b^{o}rok)	= 'bless!, you (man) must bless'	bàrek
Imperative	Singular	2	fem.	[ BRK (birkī) ]	= 'bless!, you (woman) must bless'	bàrkī
Imperative	Plural	2	masc.	— (not attested)	'bless!, you (men) must bless'	bàrkū
Imperative	Plural	2	fem.	— (not attested)	'bless!, you (women) must bless'	bàreknāh
Infinitive	Infinitive construct			L-BRK (li-brūk)	= 'to bless'	l^{e}vàrek
Infinitive	Infinitive absolute			BRK (barōk)	= 'bless'	bàrūk
Participle (active)	Singular		masc.	BRK (būrek)	= '(a man:) blessing'	bàrūk
Participle (active)	Singular		fem.	BRKT (būrekt)	= '(a woman:) blessing'	b^{e}rūkāh
Participle (active)	Plural		masc.	BRKM (bōrkīm)	= '(men:) blessing'	b^{e}rūkīm
Participle (active)	Plural		fem.	— (not attested)	'(women:) blessing'	b^{e}rūkōt
(passive)	Singular		masc.	— (not attested)	'(a man:) blessed'	bàrūk
(passive)	Singular		fem.	BRKT (barūkt)	= '(a woman:) blessed'	b^{e}rūkāh
(passive)	Plural		masc.	BRKM (b^{e}rūkīm)	= '(men:) blessed'	b^{e}rūkīm
(passive)	Plural		fem.	— (not attested)	'(women:) blessed'	b^{e}rūkōt

===== Niph‘al =====
The following Niph‘al forms are attested in Punic and Neo-Punic (verb: P-‘-L, fel, 'to make'; < Phoenician pa‘ol):

Form				(Neo-)Punic	Translation	(cf. Hebrew)
Perfect (Suffixing form)	Singular	3	masc.	NP‘L (nef‘al)	= 'it (m.) is/was made'	niph‘al
Perfect (Suffixing form)	Singular	3	fem.	NP‘L’ (nef‘ala)	= 'it (f.) is/was made'	niph‘^{e}lāh
Perfect (Suffixing form)	Plural	3	masc.	NP‘L’, NP‘L (nef‘alū)	= 'they are/were made'	niph‘^{e}lū

===== Pi‘el =====
The following Pi‘el forms are attested in Punic and Neo-Punic (verb: Ḥ-D-Š, ḥados, 'to make new, to restore'):

Form				(Neo-)Punic	Translation	(cf. Hebrew)
Perfect (Suffixing form)	Singular	1		ḤDŠTY, ḤDŠT (ḥiddesti)	= 'I restore'	ḥiddàšti
Perfect (Suffixing form)	Singular	3	masc.	ḤYDŠ, ḤDŠ (ḥiddes)	= 'he restores'	ḥiddēš
Perfect (Suffixing form)	Plural	3	masc.	ḤDŠ (ḥiddesū)	= 'they restore'	ḥiddēšū
Imperfect	Singular	3	masc.	YḤDŠ (yeḥeddes)	= 'he will restore'	y^{e}ḥaddēš
Imperative	Singular	2	masc.	ḤDŠ (ḥeddes)	= 'restore!'	ḥaddēš
Infinitive	Infinitive construct			L-ḤDŠ (liḥeddes)	= 'to restore'	ḥaddēš
Participle (active)	Singular		masc.	MḤDŠ (m^{e}ḥeddes)	= 'restoring (man)'	m^{e}ḥaddēš
Participle (active)	Plural		masc.	MḤDŠM (m^{e}ḥeddesīm)	= 'restoring (men)'	m^{e}ḥadd^{e}šīm

===== Yiph‘il =====
The following Yiph‘il forms are attested in Punic and Neo-Punic (verb: Q-D-Š, qados, 'to dedicate'):

Form				(Neo-)Punic	Translation	(cf. Hebrew Hiph‘il)
Perfect (Suffixing form)	Singular	3	masc.	’YQDŠ, YQDŠ (iqdēs)	= 'he dedicates, has dedicated'	hiqdīš
Perfect (Suffixing form)	Singular	3	fem.	HQDYŠ‘ (iqdísa)	= 'she dedicates, has dedicated'	hiqdīšāh
Perfect (Suffixing form)	Plural	3	masc.	YQDŠ‘ (yiqdísū)	= 'they dedicate, have dedicated'	hiqdīšū
Imperfect	Plural	3	masc.	YQDŠN (yiqdisūn)	= 'they will dedicate'	yaqdišū
Cohortative	Singular	1		’QDŠ (iqdisa)	= 'let me dedicate'	’aqdēš, ’aqd^{e}šāh
Cohortative	Singular	3	masc.	YQDŠ(?) (yiqdisa)	= 'let him dedicate'	yaqdēš
Imperative	Singular	2	masc.	HQDŠ (iqdes or aqdes)	= 'dedicate!'	haqdēš
Infinitive	Infinitive construct			L-QDŠ (l-aqdīs)	= 'to dedicate'	haqdīš
Infinitive	Infinitive absolute			YQDŠ (yeqdes)	= '(to) dedicate'	haqdēš
Participle (active)	Singular		masc.	MYQDŠ, MQDŠ (miqdīs)	= 'dedicating (man)'	maqdīš

===== Weak verbs =====
Many (Neo-)Punic verbs are "weak": depending on the specific root consonants certain deviations of the standard verbal paradigm occur. For example in the group I-n (verbs with first consonant N-) the n may disappear through assimilation. Summary:

Group	Example	Phenomena
I-n (or פ״ן)	N-D-R (nador), 'to vow'	N- can disappear through assimilation
I-y (פ״וי)	Y-T-N (yaton), 'to give'	Yiph‘il > yūph‘il
III-y (ל״ה)	B-N-Y (bano), 'to build'	-Y can disappear
II-gem (ע״ע)	Ḥ-N-N (ḥan), 'to show favor'	second and third root consonant are the same ("geminated")
II-wy (ע״וי)	K-N (kōn), 'to be'	two-consonant root; Pi‘el > polel

==== Form and use ====
In Punic there was no one-on-one correlation between form and use. For example, the suffix form (perfect) is often translated by a present tense, but it may also refer to the past or future. Tense, aspect, and mood of verbal forms were determined by syntax, not by morphology.

The tense, aspect and mood of a given verbal form may depend on:

1. whether the form is part of the main clause, or of a subordinate clause;
2. if in a subordinate clause, it may depend on the type of subordinate clause (for example, conditional, or temporal);
3. word order may be important: does the verbal form precede or follow the subject of the clause?;
4. it also may depend on a verbal form earlier in the same clause: suffix forms or an infinitive absolute used consecutive to another verbal form, take the same tense, aspect and mood as the preceding form.

=== Numbers ===
The numbers from one to ten are:

	1	2	3	4	5	6	7	8	9	10
(masculine form)	’ḤD (’eḥḥad)	ŠNM (snēm)	ŠLŠ, Š‛LŠ (salūs)	’RB‛ (’arba‛)	ḤMŠ (ḥames)	ŠŠ, Š’Š (ses)	ŠB‛ (séba‛)	ŠMN, ŠMN’ (samūne)	TŠ‛ (tésa‛)	‛ŠR, ‛Š‛R, ‛SR (‛asar)
(feminine form)	’ḤT (’eḥḥat)	ŠTM (stēm)	ŠLŠT (salūst)	’RB‛T (’arbá‛at)	ḤMŠT (ḥamist)	ŠŠT (sésit)	ŠB‛T (sebá‛at)	ŠMNT (samūnīt)	TŠ‛T (tisá‛at)	‛ŠRT (‛asert)
(cf. Hebrew, masc.)	’eḥād	š^{e}náyim	šalóš	’arbá‛	ḥamēš	šēš	šèba‛	š^{e}monèh	tēša‛	‛èśer

Punic and Neo-Punic take part in the so-called "Semitic polarity": the numbers 3-10 take the feminine form with masculine nouns, and vice versa. Thus with masculine BN (bin, 'son') or YM (yom, 'day'), numbers take the feminine form ending in -T, while with feminine ŠT (sat, 'year'), they take the masculine form without -T. For example:

‛W’ Š‛NT ‛SR WŠ‛LŠ (ḥawa’ sanūt ‛asar w-salūs):

'He lived (verb Ḥ-W-Y, 'to live') thirteen years' (KAI 144)

Multiples of ten take the form of a plural (-īm) of the word for 10 or 3-9:

	20	30	40	50	60	70	80	90
(both masc. and fem.)	‛SRM, HŠRM (‛esrīm)	ŠLŠM (salūsīm)	’RB‛M, ’RBM (’arba‛īm, ’arbīm)	ḤMŠM, ‛MŠM (ḥamissīm)	ŠŠM, ŠYŠM (sissīm)	ŠB‛M (sib‛īm)	ŠMNM’ (samūnīm)	TŠM, ṬYŠM (tissīm)

One hundred is M’T (mīt), its dual M’TM (mitēm) is 200; 1000 is ’LP (’èlef), and 10,000 is RB’ (ribō).

=== Particles ===
An important particle is the so-called nota objecti, or accusative particle, ’YT (’et) (rarely ’T; usually T- before a substantive with definite article or with demonstrative pronoun). It is placed before a substantive and indicates that that substantive is an object in the sentence (mostly a direct object).

=== Syntax ===
Word order in Punic and Neo-Punic can vary, but this variation has its grammatical limits. For example, in a clause with an imperfect prefixing form the subject can either precede or follow the verb. However, as a rule, if the verb precedes it refers to the present, while if the subject precedes, the verb refers to the future.

The repertoire of possible ways in (Neo-)Punic to express a certain combination of tense, aspect, and mood seems to be more restricted than in Phoenician, but at the same time the rules seem to have become less strict.

== Sample text ==
Act V of Plautus's comedy Poenulus opens with Hanno speaking in Punic, his native language, in the first ten lines. Then follows a slightly different version of the same lines. Charles Krahmalkov is of the opinion that the first ten lines are Neo-Punic, the next ten Punic.

Krahmalkov proposed the theory that Plautus, who often translated Greek comedies into Latin, in this case too reworked a Greek original, the Karkhedonios ('The Carthaginian'; Athenian comic poet Alexis wrote a play with this title). In this case, there probably also existed a Punic translation of the Greek comedy, and Plautus took parts of this Punic version to give his Carthaginian character authentic speech. Moreover, in this way he could enter puns by introducing in his play a would-be translator who, to comical effect, falsely claimed to understand Punic and thus gave nonsensical 'translations'.

=== Hanno's Punic speech ===
First version (Neo-Punic)

Yth alonim ualonuth sicorathi symacom syth ^{930}
chy mlachthi in ythmum ysthyalm ych-ibarcu mysehi
li pho caneth yth bynuthi uad edin byn ui
bymarob syllohom alonim ubymysyrthohom
byth limmoth ynnocho thuulech-antidamas chon
ys sidobrim chi fel yth chyl is chon chen liful ^{935}
yth binim ys dybur ch-innocho-tnu agorastocles
yth emanethi hy chirs aelichot sithi nasot
bynu yid ch-illuch ily gubulim lasibithim
bodi aly thera ynnynu yslym min cho-th iusim

Second version (the "unknown text"; Punic)

Yth alonim ualoniuth sicorathii sthymhimi hymacom syth ^{940}
combaepumamitalmetlotiambeat
iulecantheconaalonimbalumbar dechor
bats . . . . hunesobinesubicsillimbalim
esseantidamossonalemuedubertefet
donobun.hun ec cil thumucommucroluful ^{945}
altanimauosduberithemhuarcharistolem
sitt esed anec naso ters ahelicot
alemu [y]s duber timur mucop[m] suistiti
aoccaaneclictorbod es iussilim limmim colus

Plautus (or a later redactor) next provided a Latin translation of the preceding lines:

=== Latin and English translation ===
Latin

deos deasque veneror, qui hanc urbem colunt, ^{950}
ut quod de mea re huc veni rite venerim,
measque hic ut gnatas et mei fratris filium
reperire me siritis, di vostram fidem.
[quae mihi surruptae sunt et fratris filium.]
sed hic mihi antehac hospes Antidamas fuit; ^{955}
eum fecisse aiunt, sibi quod faciundum fuit.
eius filium esse hic praedicant Agorastoclem:
ad eum hospitalem hanc tesseram mecum fero;
is in hisce habitare monstratust regionibus.
hos percontabor qui hinc egrediuntur foras.

English

I worship the gods and goddesses who preside over this city,
that I may have come hither with good omen as to this business of mine, on which I have come;
and, to find my daughters and the son of my cousin,
lend me your aid, ye gods, that you may permit me
those who were stolen away from me, and his son from my cousin.
But here lived formerly my guest Antidamas.
They say that he has done that which he was doomed to do.
They say that his son Agorastocles lives here.
To him am I carrying with me this token of hospitality.
He has been pointed as living in this neighbourhood.
I'll make enquiry of these who are coming hither out of doors.

=== Comments ===
As a Latin transliteration, the text as recorded necessarily departs from the original Punic speech. Lines 930-939 have only survived in one manuscript, the "Ambrosianus" A (the "Ambrosian Palimpsest"). The "unknown" text, lines 940-949, has also survived in three manuscripts of the Palatine family (P). The several manuscript sources show many differences among them, with the P scripts showing some words being split out and some mis-interpretations. The "unknown" text used here is from the Ambrosianus A; both families have lost small chunks of text over time. Recently efforts have been made to, among other things, fill in the redactions in the "unknown language" part and to properly split the morphemes. The close mirroring between lines 930-931/940 and lines 937/947 (underlined above) suggests that the "unknown language" text (lines 940-949) is also Punic. Gratwick and Krahmalkov conclude that the more corrupted "unknown" form (940-949) is earlier (basically Plautus's own text in Punic), while lines 930-939 reflect a “late 'scholar's repair'” from Late Antiquity in Neo-Punic.

Some Punic phrases known in the text include:

- 930/940: Yth alonim ualoniuth sicorathii (sthymhimi) hymacom syth = ’T ’LNM W-’LNT ZKRT (Š-QRYT?; [940:] ŠTMḤW?) H-MQM ST.

- yth = ’et, accusative particle (nota objecti): indicates that an object follows (cf. Hebrew ’et)
- alonim = ’alonīm: plural masculine of ’alōn: 'gods' (cf. Hebrew ’elō^{a}h, 'god, goddess', plural ’elohîm); = Latin deōs; cf. alonim in 933 ~ di ('gods') in 953
- u- = w-, 'and' (Hebrew w-); = Latin -que
- aloniuth = ’alonōt: plural feminine of ’alōn: 'goddesses (of)'; = Latin deās
- sicorathi: corresponds with Hebrew zakàrti, 'I have been mindful of, I remember, I keep holy'; = Latin veneror (note: s in sicorathi ~ z in zakàrti: in late Punic the four Phoenician sibilants, s, š, ș, and z, were all pronounced /s/); also interpreted as si-qart, '(of) this city', but that is less probable because then a verb is missing in the sentence, and it would make hymacom syth, 'this city', superfluous.
- hymacom: ha-maqōm, definite article + 'place, city' (Hebrew hammaqōm); = Latin urbem ('city'). Note: variant symacom syth (line 930) = šè + maqōm syth, 'of this city'. mucom in 948 is also maqōm.
- syth: demonstrative pronoun 'this', singular feminine (Hebrew: zōt) or masculine (Hebrew: zèh) = Latin hanc (in Hebrew maqōm, 'place, city', usually is a masculine word, but occasionally it can be feminine). In 940P esse is the Plautine Punic spelling, 930 and 940A have the late Neo-Punic spelling syth.

- 937/947: yth emanethi hy chirs aelichot / sitt esed anec naso ters ahelicot = ’T-M ’NKY H’ ḤRŠ (YŠ) H-HLYKT / Š-’TY ’Z ’NK NŠ’ ḤRŠ H-HLYKT.

- yth = ’et: probably the accusative particle again, here indicating an indirect object ('for', 'to'; = Latin ad); or it may be the preposition ’et, 'with' (cf. Latin mecum, 'with me')
- esed = zdè: demonstrative pronoun, singular masculine, 'this, this one' (Hebrew: zèh); = Latin eum ('him'). In 947P ese the original Plautine Punic spelling has been preserved.
- anec: personal pronoun 1st person, 'I, I myself' (Hebrew anoki) (emanethi in 937 is a corrupt spelling, read (-em) anethi, with ch misread as th, and anechi = 'I, I myself')
- naso = našō’: infinitive absolute of the verb N-Š-’, 'to carry, bring': 'I bring' (Hebrew N-Ś-’, 'to lift, bear, carry'); = Latin fero, 'I bring' (in Punic an infinitive absolute, if consecutive to the main verb, represents the same tense, aspect, person, number and gender as the main verb, in this case a first person singular, cf. anec)
- chirs / (ters): substantive, construct state, 'potsherd of' (Hebrew ḥèreś, 'pottery, potsherd'); = Latin tesseram, 'tile'
- aelichot / ahelicot = ha-helikōt: definite article + substantive plural, 'the hospitality, the guest-friendship' (cf. Hebrew hēlèk, 'visitor'); = Latin hospitalem (a «tessera hospitalis» was an object a guest presented to be recognized)

- duber, dubyr in 936, 946, 948: Semitic root D-B-R, 'to speak, word'
- fel, 'he did' (935), li-ful (935) and lu-ful (945), 'to do' (infinitive construct): Semitic root P-‘-L, 'to make, to do'.
