= Mausoleum of Gasr Doga =

Ancient mausoleum in Libya

Gasr Doga
- قصر دوغة (Arabic)
- Qasr Doga
- Location within Libya
- 32°29′16.9″N 13°41′55.7″E
- Type: mausoleum
- Cultures: Punic
- Location: Tarhuna Gebel, Libya

History
- Built: 1st century CE

Site notes
- Condition: In ruins

The Mausoleum of Gasr Doga is an ancient mausoleum dating from the first century CE, located near Tarhuna, Libya.

The mausoleum, dubbed "one of the most imposing funerary monuments of ancient Tripolitania", was built by a member of the local Libyco-Punic elite, and its architectural composition evokes the style of royal Numidian monuments. Its decorative elements reflect a fusion of local artistic traditions and imported motifs from Italy.

During Late Antiquity and the Islamic era, the mausoleum became the nucleus of a fortified settlement, predominantly built using spolia sourced from the mausoleum itself.

== Geography ==
The Gasr Doga mausoleum is situated within the Tarhuna Gebel, a fertile area characterized by its hilly terrain, located approximately 60 kilometers southwest of the ancient city of Leptis Magna.

The mausoleum sits atop a limestone terrace overlooking the Wadi Doga, approximately 900 meters northwest of the ancient remains of Medina Doga. Medina Doga, likely identified as Mesphe from historical records, has yet to undergo formal excavation. Surrounding discoveries include underground tombs, indicating that the site has been inhabited since at least the first century BC.

Boundary stones found nearby indicate that both Gasr Doga and Medina Doga were located in a contested frontier between the territories of Leptis and Oea (modern Tripoli), an area that witnessed disputes and raids in the first century AD.

== Historical overview ==
=== Antiquity ===
The mausoleum of Gasr Doga likely belonged to a wealthy member of the local Libyco-Punic elite. Situated near Leptis' territory, this individual benefited from Romanization and gained political influence. During the construction of Gasr Doga, the nearby Gebel Tarhuna area was connected to Leptis through a road built under Aelius Lamia's proconsulate. This connection with the coast boosted the Tarhuna area's prosperity by facilitating connections and trade with the Roman state.

While the coastal elite invested in public buildings, Gasr Doga's owner showcased their wealth through this monumental funerary structure. The architectural style, influenced by Hellenistic and Italian designs, suggests ties to the Mediterranean coastal region. However, Gasr Doga's distinctive blend of styles and large scale reflect the burial practices of the Numidian culture, which borrowed from Hellenistic traditions. The mausoleum influenced later Tripolitanian funerary structures, including temple tombs like Gasr el-Banat and Ghirza tomb North A.

=== Late Antiquity and Islamic rule ===
In later periods, the mausoleum of Gasr Doga evolved into a fortified watchtower surrounded by a village and a defensive ditch. The materials originally used to construct the mausoleum were repurposed for building houses and defensive walls. The pottery found in the village dates from the fourth to the twelfth centuries AD, suggesting a long period of occupation. Among the discoveries are fragments of late Tripolitanian Red Slip Ware and a fifth-century bronze coin.

The summit of the village, likely used as a granary since the early Islamic period, may have been accessed through a tower situated on the eastern wing of the façade. Notable structures within the village include a well-preserved room with two aisles and remnants of a defensive circuit, hinting at the presence of a gate.

The podium's surface is covered with graffiti, ranging from contemporary Arabic inscriptions to older figurative drawings that depict hunting scenes. Dating back to the fifth to twelfth centuries AD, these drawings reveal the artistic expression of the local Libyco-Berber culture, which is otherwise scarce in figurative representation.

The Arabic term "gasr", commonly used in North Africa to denote mausoleums, translates to "castle" or "fortified structure," fittingly describing the site's transformation from a mausoleum to a fortified watchtower after classical antiquity.

=== Modern research ===
Gasr Doga first attracted the attention of European scholars during the 19th century, drawing visits from several notable travelers. In 1817, William H. Smyth documented his observations of the site, followed by Heinrich Barth's visit in 1849, Gerhard Rohlfs in 1887, Henry S. Cowper in 1897, and Federico Minutilli in 1912. These travelers provided early descriptions of the mausoleum and the surrounding structures, which appeared to be in better condition at the time than they are today. Barth's accounts, in particular, offer detailed insights, including the first published image of the site.

In the early 20th century, Salvatore Aurigemma extensively documented the mausoleum, aided by Luigi Turba, whose illustrations formed the foundation of Aurigemma's 1954 publication on the subject. Further study seasons were conducted from 1999 to 2001 as part of research projects led by the Archaeological Mission of the Roma Tre University, under the direction of Prof. Luisa Musso.

== Architecture ==
The mausoleum of Gasr Doga is distinguished by its impressive dimensions. Measuring 16 meters in length, 11 meters in width, and reaching a height of 9 meters, it commands attention with its imposing presence. Constructed entirely from two types of local stone sourced from nearby wadi banks, the mausoleum exhibits a combination of greyish limestone and yellowish limestone. The greyish limestone, with its fine-grained texture, is used extensively throughout the structure for its durability and suitability for detailed carving. In contrast, the lighter yellowish limestone is employed in specific areas, although it is more susceptible to erosion.

The mausoleum's architectural layout is characterized by a unique U-shaped design, created by adding wings to a rectangular structure. This design choice gives the mausoleum a distinct façade on its short, southern side, breaking up its otherwise cubic appearance.

The podium, resting on a platform of four steps, consists of two superimposed storeys constructed in ashlar masonry. The lower storey measures 3.45 meters in height, while the upper storey stands at 2.9 meters. Both storeys feature socles at the bottom, cornices at the top, and shallow angle pilasters at the corners. Traces of a colonnaded portico that once crowned the podium are still visible, with alternating projecting blocks serving as pedestals for column bases.

Furthermore, the mausoleum includes underground funerary chambers accessible from the façade. A short flight of steps leads to a shaft, granting access to a series of corridors and vaulted chambers, which are identical in shape and size.

Various architectural elements, such as column bases and capitals, from the third storey are now dispersed around the mausoleum. The column bases lack plinths, indicating an early date, and exhibit similarities with those from the Macellum at Leptis Magna, suggesting a comparable design. The capitals feature a cylindrical kalathos adorned with acanthus leaves, displaying characteristics typical of early first-century Corinthian examples. Despite some awkwardness in their execution, they reflect a blend of local and imported influences, possibly from southern Italy. Additionally, other decorative blocks found nearby suggest the repurposing of materials from different structures, indicating a mix of local tradition and foreign models in Gasr Doga's architectural decoration.

== Inscription ==
Two limestone blocks found at Gasr Doga in 1995 and 1999 likely belong to the same structure, possibly an entablature. They are distinguished by their grey limestone material, with a pink patina, and feature a Neo-Punic inscription prominently displayed on a projecting band at the top. Block 1, which forms a right angle, has a partially preserved inscription with two lines, while Block 2, though more damaged, preserves a single line that matches the beginning of Block 1's inscription. If connected to the mausoleum, the inscription may point to the importance of the architectural project and the person for whom it was erected.

The inscription, skillfully crafted in a monumental Neo-Punic script, probably includes a mention of Roman chronology and perhaps the name of the individual associated with the structure or a deity. Interpreting the inscription presents challenges, as it could signify anything from a dedication to the deceased to a votive inscription for a temple. Given its length, estimated to be at least 4 meters, it likely spanned a significant portion of the structure.

== See also ==
- Henscir Suffit – another mausoleum in Tripolitania, Libya
- Libyco-Punic Mausoleum of Dougga – a Libyco-Punic mausoleum in Tunisia
