= Antidamas =

Ancient Greek historian and writer

Antidamas or Antidamus of Heracleia was a writer of ancient Greece. He wrote in Greek (or Latin, according to Arrian) a history of Alexander the Great, and some moral works, which are referred to by the 5th century writer Fabius Planciades Fulgentius.

Scholars question whether these works, and their author, even existed, and suggest that the titles and author were fabrications of Fulgentius's, who is not considered a trustworthy or accurate source.

"Antidamas"—unrelated to this Antidamas—is also the name of the father of the main character Agorastocles in Plautus's play Poenulus.
