= Henscir Suffit =

Archaeological site in western Libya

Hescir Suffit
- هنشير صفيت (Arabic)
- Location within Libya
- 32°01′41.6″N 12°35′36.1″E
- Type: fortified farm, mausoleum
- Periods: Roman
- Location: Yefren, Libya
- Region: Nafusa Mountains, Tripolitania

Site notes
- Excavation dates: 1926
- Archaeologists: Renato Bartoccini

Henscir Suffit (Arabic: هنشير صفيت) is an archaeological site in the Nafusa Mountains of Tripolitania, in modern-day Libya, located south-east of Yafran. The site preserves the remains of a Roman-period settlement within the Tripolitanian limes, including a fortified farm, a mausoleum, and nearby ashlar-built structure known as Qasr Suffit.

== Research history ==
The site was excavated in 1926 by archaeologist Renato Bartoccini.

== Description ==
The site is located in the Nafusa Mountains, in the Tripolitania region of modern Libya. It is located south-east of Yafran. During the Roman period, the area was inhabited by a Berber population.

=== Fortified farm ===
Henscir Suffit is identified as a Type IV fortified farm within the Tripolitanian limes, originally built in "Period I" masonry, characterised by large, well-dressed stone blocks and occasionally rounded corners. It was later modified with the addition of an external tower and a controlled entrance system.

Bartoccini interpreted the indirect entrance at Henscir Suffit as serving a domestic function, intended "to shield the intimate life of the house from extraneous eyes." This view was challenged by R. G. Goodchild, who argued that there is little evidence for concerns with female seclusion in ancient Libyan society, as known from Islamic contexts, noting that women appear unveiled on contemporary funerary monuments. Instead, he suggested that such a system was more likely designed for defensive or security purposes.

=== Mausoleum ===
The Henscir Suffit mausoleum is a multi-storey aedicula-type tomb, a widespread Roman form also found in Tripolitania, with parallels such as Gasr Shaddad near Leptis Magna. In these cases, the aedicula element was integrated into a tower-and-obelisk tomb design. Like Gasr Doga, it was placed on the escarpment edge in a prominent position, making it visible from a great distance. During the Libyan civil war in 2011, the site's commanding position drew fighting, resulting in minor damage to the mausoleum. Combatants were buried at its base.

=== Qasr Suffit ===
Qasr Suffit is situated roughly 250 meters northeast of the mausoleum, on a nearby small hill. According to archaeologist Isabella Welsby Sjöström, it is a "good example of first- and second-century CE ashlar masonry," which she describes as "easily identified as Roman."

== See also ==
- Gasr Doga – a comparable mausoleum in Tripolitania, Libya
- Ghirza
- Libyco-Punic Mausoleum of Dougga – a Libyco-Punic mausoleum in Tunisia
- Roman Libya

== Bibliography ==
=== Sources ===
- Goodchild, R. G. (1950). "The Limes Tripolitanus II". The Journal of Roman Studies. 40 (1–2). Society for the Promotion of Roman Studies: 30–38.
- Nikolaus, Julia (2016). "Beyond Ghirza: Roman-period mausolea in Tripolitania". In Mugnai, N.; Nikolaus, J.; Ray, N. (eds.). De Africa Romaque: Merging Cultures across North Africa. London: Society for Libyan Studies. pp. 199–214.
- Welsby Sjöström, Isabella (2024). "In Search of the Romans in Jabal Nafusa and Surrounding Area". In Mugnai, Niccolò (ed.). Tripolitania in the Roman Empire and Beyond. British Institute for Libyan and Northern African Studies. pp. 173–192. doi:10.2307/jj.24081269.15. ISBN 978-1-915808-11-0.
