= Tripolitania Punic inscriptions =

Punic inscriptions found in Tripolitania, Libya

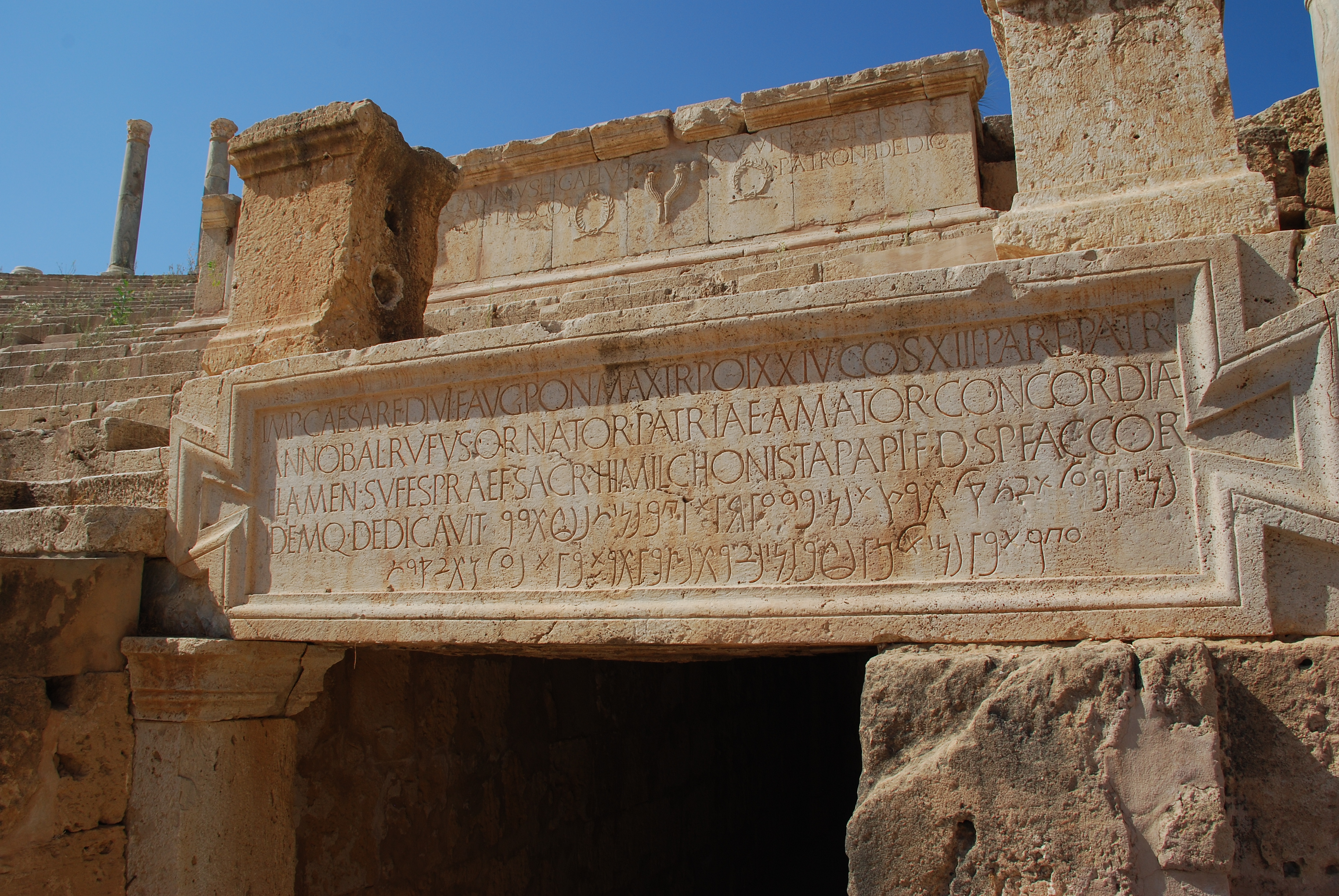
- Bilingual inscription at Leptis Magna
- Writing: Punic

The Tripolitania Punic inscriptions are a number of Punic language inscriptions found in the region of Tripolitania – specifically its three classical cities of Leptis Magna, Sabratha and Oea (modern Tripoli), with the vast majority being found in Leptis Magna. The inscriptions have been found in various periods over the last two centuries, and were catalogued by Giorgio Levi Della Vida. A subset of the inscriptions feature in all the major corpuses of Canaanite and Aramaic inscriptions, notably as KAI 119-132.

In addition to inscriptions in the Punic script, the corpus includes a number of Punic inscriptions written in Latin script, such as KAI 304-305.

According to Karel Jongeling, 68 inscriptions are known from Leptis Magna, 15 from Sabratha, 10 from Oea, 4 from Zaiuet el-Mahgiub, 3 from Wadi el-Amud, 2 from Germa and 1 each from El-Amruni, Gasr Doga, Bir Gebira, Bu Khemmàsc, Henchir Gen Rieime, Misurata Marina, Al-Qusbat, Ras el-Hadagia, Sàmet el-Crèma, Taglit and Tarhuna.

== Early discoveries ==
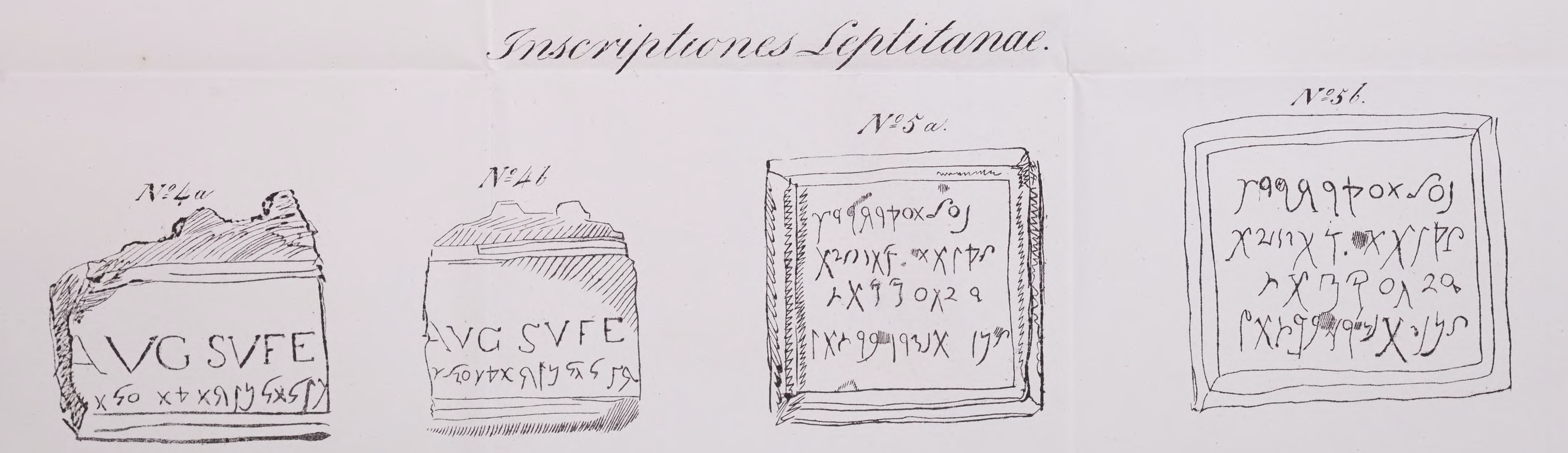
The two known Leptis Magna inscriptions published in Hendrik Arent Hamaker's 1828 Miscellanea Phoenicia, and later re-published in Wilhelm Gesenius's 1837 Scripturae Linguaeque Phoeniciae, showing two different copies of each. The inscription on the left is Delaporte‘s 1806 find.

Prior to 1927, only eight Punic inscriptions from all of Tripolitania had been published.

The first find was in 1806 by Jacques-Denis Delaporte at Leptis Magna, published by Ali Bey el Abbassi in 1814-16, and later in Delaporte‘s 1836 memoir:

I turned south and climbed the remains of the temple of Friendship. I had barely reached the mound when I set foot upon a hard stone. The foreign characters under the Latin characters engraved on it made this monument so precious in my eyes, that I have not hesitated to include a copy of the inscription... It is a shame that it is only a fragment, because it could allow clarification of Punic or Phoenician writing, which is, I believe, that of this inscription, because lingua punica quidquid terraram est à Cyrene usque ad Gades occupavit... The stone is still on the spot: I have not urged the Americans to seize it, because it suits France better, if it is deemed worthy of adorning the Napoleon Museum.

Delaporte identified the language as Punic by reference to a quote from Samuel Bochart's 1646 work Canaan, which translates in full as: "...the language of Canaan, whether Phoenician or Punic, which was brought from Phoenicia into Africa, and occupied all the world from Cyrene to Gades."

By 1857, Moritz Abraham Levy stated that five inscriptions were known.

== Later discoveries ==
For forty years between 1927-1967, Giorgio Levi Della Vida worked to prepare a corpus of the Punic inscriptions in Tripolitania, intended as the Punic parallel of Joyce Reynolds' and John Bryan Ward-Perkins' The Inscriptions of Roman Tripolitania (IRT). Levi Della Vida's corpus brought together research which has often appeared in periodicals that are not very accessible, sometimes defunct, and were not always accompanied by adequate photographic documentation.

== Concordance ==
Image	Discovery date and location	Punic concordance				Latin (if bilingual)	Current Location	Other ref.
Image	Discovery date and location	Tripolitania	Iscrizione Puniche della Tripolitania	KAI, CIS, NE	Levy 1857	IRT	Current Location	Other ref.
An inscription			1					
An inscription	1806, Leptis Magna		9		I1		British Museum (BM 1862,0527.2)	
An inscription	1824, Leptis Magna		10	NE 434, B-a	I2		British Museum (BM 135744)	
An inscription			11		I3			
An inscription			12		I4	655	lost	
An inscription			13		I5	654	Red Castle Museum	
An inscription		12	17	KAI 130				
An inscription		13	18	KAI 129				
An inscription		14	19	KAI 131				
An inscription			16			481		
		27	21	KAI 120		319	Leptis Museum	
		28	22	KAI 122				
		29	23	KAI 123			Leptis Museum	
An inscription		30	24a and 24b	KAI 121		321-323	in situ	
			25	KAI 127		294		
		31	26	KAI 124		338		
		32	27	KAI 126		318, 347		
		34	29	KAI 128				
		36	30	KAI 125		305		
		37	31	KAI 119				
An inscription			68	KAI 132				
	1901, Breviglieri		76	KAI 118, RES 662				
An inscription			82A-K					
An inscription			96					

== Other ==
- KAI 178 Leptis Magna Latino-Libyan [in LATIN]

== Bibliography ==
- Levi Della Vida, 1927: Giorgio Levi Della Vida Le iscrizioni neopuniche della tripolitania, Libya (Rivista didella Tripolitania) 1 (III) 1927 91-116
- Levi Della Vida, 1935: Giorgio Levi Della Vida Due iscrizioni neopuniche di Leptis Magna, Africa Italiana 6 1935 3-15; 107-115
- Levi Della Vida, 1938: Giorgio Levi Della Vida Il Teatro Augusteo di Leptis Magna secondo le ultime scoperte e un'iscrizione bilingue in latino e neo-punico II, Africa Italiana 6, 3-4 1935 (published 1938) 104-109
- Levi Della Vida, 1942: Giorgio Levi Della Vida The Phoenician God Satrapes, Bulletin of the American Schools of Oriental Research 87 1942 29-32
- Levi Della Vida, 1949: Giorgio Levi Della Vida Iscrizioni neopuniche di Tripolitania, Rendiconti di Accademia Nazionale dei Lincei 8 1949 399-412
- Levi Della Vida, 1967: Giorgio Levi Della Vida Su una bilingue latino-punica da Leptis Magna, Atti dell'Accademia delle Scienze di Torino 101 1967 395-409
- Levi Della Vida, 1987: Giorgio Levi Della Vida and Amadasi Guzzo, Iscrizione Puniche della Tripolitania, 1987
- Barron, Caroline (2020-01-01). "Appendix: amator concordia, ornator patriae. The Latinisation of Punic titles in early imperial Lepcis Magna". Libyan Studies. doi:10.1017/lis.2020.7. S2CID 225723076.
