= Nota accusativi =

Grammatical term

Nota accusativi is a grammatical term for a particle (an uninflected word) that marks a noun as being in the accusative case. An example is the use of the word a in Spanish before an animate direct object: Jorge lleva a su gato. 'Jorge carries his cat.'.

== Esperanto ==
Officially, in Esperanto, the suffix letter -n is used to mark an accusative. But a few modern speakers use the unofficial preposition na instead of the final -n.

Mi havas domon.
I have house.ACC
I have a house.

Mi havas na domo.
I have ACC house.
I have a house.

== Hebrew ==
In Hebrew the preposition אֶת et is used for definite nouns in the accusative. Those nouns might be used with the definite article (ה ha 'the'). Otherwise, the object is modified by a possessive pronominal suffix, by virtue of being a nomen regens within a genitive phrasing, or as a proper name. To continue with the Hebrew example:

אֲנִי רוֹאֶה אֵת הַכֶּלֶב.
Ani ro'eh et ha-kelev.
I see DO the.dog.
I see the dog.

אֲנִי רוֹאֶה אֵת כַּלְבִּי.
Ani ro'eh et kalbi.
I see DO my.dog.
I see my dog.

אֲנִי רוֹאֶה אֵת כֶּלֶב דָּנִיֵּאל.
Ani ro'eh et kelev Dani'el.
I see DO dog Daniel.
I see Daniel's dog.

אֲנִי רוֹאֶה אֵת דָּנִיֵּאל.
Ani ro'eh et Dani'el.
I see DO Daniel.
I see Daniel.

On the other hand, "I see a dog" is simply

אֲנִי רוֹאֶה כֶּלֶב.
Ani ro'eh kelev.
I see dog.
I see a dog.

This example is obviously a specialized use of the nota accusativi, since Hebrew does not use the nota accusativi unless the noun is in the definitive.

== Japanese ==
In Japanese, the particle を (pronounced お o) is the direct object marker and marks the recipient of an action.

== Korean ==
In Korean, the postposition 을 eul or 를 reul is the direct object marker and marks the recipient of an action. For example:

나는 라면을 먹었다.
Naneun ramyeoneul meogeotda.
I ate ramen.

을 is used when the previous syllable (면 myeon in this case) is closed, i.e. when it ends with a consonant (ㄴ n in 면 myeon in this case).

나는 나비를 보았다.
Naneun nabireul boatda.
I saw a butterfly.

를 is used when the previous syllable (비 bi in this case) is open, i.e. when it ends with a vowel (l i in 비 bi in this case).

== Toki Pona ==
In Toki Pona, the word e is used to mark a direct object.

jan li moku e telo.
person PRED consume ACC liquid
A person drinks water.

== Other languages ==
Nota accusativi also exists in Armenian, Greek and other languages.

In other languages, especially those with grammatical case, there is usually a separate form (for each declension if declensions exist) of the accusative case. The nota accusativi should not be confused with such case forms, as the term nota accusativi is a separate particle of the accusative case.

== See also ==
- Accusative case
