= Poenulus =

Ancient Roman play by Plautus

- Original language: Latin, Punic
- Written by: Plautus
- Characters: Agorastocles; Milphio; Adelphasium; Anterastilus; Lycus; Antamonides; Counselors; Collybiscus; Syncerastus; Hanno; Giddenis slave boy
- Genre: Roman comedy
- Setting: a street in Calydon, Before the houses of Agorastocles and Lycus, and the Temple of Venus

Premiere
- Date: c. 195–189 BC
- Place: Rome

Poenulus, also called The Little Carthaginian or The Little Punic Man, is a Latin comedic play for the early Roman theatre by Titus Maccius Plautus, probably written between 195 and 189 BC. The play is noteworthy for containing text in Punic, spoken by the character Hanno in the fifth act. Another remarkable feature is the sympathetic portrayal of the character of the Carthaginian Hanno at a time when only a few years previously the Romans had suffered huge losses in the 2nd Punic War fought against the Carthaginian general Hannibal (218–202 BC).

The play shows signs of having been reworked, possibly for a second production, since there are two endings.

== Plot ==
A young man, Agorastocles, is in love with a girl named Adelphasium, who is a slave belonging to the pimp Lycus. Agorastocles, Adelphasium, and her sister Anterastilis were all stolen as children from Carthage. Agorastocles was purchased by a rich childless man who wanted a son, whereas the girls were sold as slaves to the pimp who intended to make them prostitutes.

Milphio, the long-suffering slave of Agorastocles, attempts to help his master obtain Adelphasium. Their plan is to trick Lycus and get him into legal trouble. Collybiscus, Agorastocles' farm steward, dresses up as a foreigner and moves into Lycus' home. Agorastocles and some witnesses then accuse Lycus of harboring his slave and threaten to take him to court.

At this point Hanno arrives from Carthage, and it is soon revealed that he is the cousin of Agorastocles' dead parents, as well as the father of the two girls. In the end, the girls are seized from Lycus, who is punished, and the story concludes with a happy family reunion. Hanno gives Agorastocles his blessing to marry his daughter.

The play is set in Calydon, a city in Aetolia in central Greece. The stage set consists of a street with the slave-dealer Lycus' house on one side, and the young man Agorastocles' house on the other; between these is a temple of Venus.

== Structure ==
The play is symmetrically structured around the trick played on Lycus as follows:

A – The two girls are in bondage; Agorastocles hopes to marry one
B – Lycus's unsuccessful sacrifice
C – The witnesses arrive; Lyco is tricked; the witnesses depart
B – Lycus's unsuccessful sacrifice
A – The girls are freed and one is promised to Agorastocles

However, certain elements, such as the two appearances of the soldier Antamoenides, and the arrival of Hanno, break the symmetry.

== Metrical structure ==
Plautus's plays are traditionally divided into five acts. However, it is not thought that the act-divisions go back to Plautus's time, since no manuscript contains them before the 15th century. Also, the acts themselves do not always match the structure of the plays, which is more clearly shown by the variation in metres.

A common metrical pattern in Plautus's plays is that each section begins with iambic senarii (which were spoken without music), then a song (canticum) in various metres, and finally each section is rounded off by trochaic septenarii, which were apparently recited or sung to the accompaniment of tibiae (a pair of reed pipes). Moore calls this the "ABC succession", where A = iambic senarii, B = other metres, and C = trochaic septenarii.

Taking iambic senarii as the beginning of a section, and trochaic septenarii as the end, Poenulus can be divided into five parts. The overall pattern is as follows:

ABC, AC, ABC, ABCBC, A... (Plautus's ending is lost)

Moore believes that everything from line 1332 (basically the whole of Act 5 scenes 6 and 7) is an interpolation, probably supplied by a producer when the original ending was lost.

The most commonly used metres in this play of 1332 lines are iambic senarii (754 lines) and trochaic septenarii (415 lines). Compared with other Plautus plays, the unaccompanied iambic senarii form an unusually large part (56%) of the play (the average in Plautus being 35%).

=== Prologue ===
- Prologue (lines 1–128): iambic senarii (128 lines)

After begging the audience to behave well, an actor explains how two girls and their second cousin, a boy, were separately stolen in Carthage and taken to Greece. The girls are being kept by a slave-owner, but the boy was adopted by a rich man who died and bequeathed him his wealth; this boy has fallen in love with one of the girls. Meanwhile the girls' father, a Carthaginian, has come to Greece looking for his daughters. The scene is Calydon in central Greece.

=== Agorastocles tries to woo Adelphasium ===
- Act 1.1 (129–209): iambic senarii (81 lines)

The young man Agorastocles is speaking to his slave Milphio about his love for Adelphasium. It appears that Agorastocles is fond of Milphio but often beats him. Milphio suggests a trick to force the slave-owner to hand over the girls: they will dress Agorastocles' farm-manager up as if he were a customer and send him into the procurer's house.

- Act 1.2 (210–260): mainly bacchiac (51 lines)

The two girls come out of the house next door to finish their toilette, and Adelphasium sings of what a lot of trouble and expense it is to maintain a high-class courtesan. Agorastocles and Milphio listen in, making comments aside.

- Act 1.2 cont. (261–409): trochaic septenarii (148 lines)

Adelphasium's sister Anterastilis reminds her that the slave-dealer is waiting for them at the festival of Venus to display them for potential customers, but Adelphasium delays, saying she wishes to avoid the crowds. At this point Agorastocles goes up to Adelphasium and tries to win her over, but she rejects him. He gets Milphio to try on his behalf, then is annoyed at the way Milphio makes sweet-talk to Adelphasium, and beats him. The girls depart for the temple.

=== Agorastocles prepares to trick Lycus ===
- Act 1.3–Act 2 (410–503): iambic senarii (93 lines)

Agorastocles promises Milphio his freedom if he can pull off his trick on the slave-dealer. Milphio sends him off to fetch some witnesses. When Agorastocles and Milphio have gone, the procurer Lycus appears, angry because he has wasted money on sacrificing six lambs but without getting good omens.

A soldier called Antamoenides (one of Lycus's potential customers) arrives. He has been invited for breakfast, and boasts of imaginary battles he has fought.

- Act 3.1–3.2 (504–614): trochaic septenarii (111 lines)

Agorastocles comes back with his witnesses. He impatiently chides them for coming so slowly. They reply indignantly. He makes them go over the plan once more. Now Milphio comes out from the house with the estate-manager Collybiscus, who is dressed like a wealthy foreigner. The witnesses examine the 300 gold coins he has been given. As they approach the procurer's door Lycus comes out.

=== Lycus is tricked ===
- Act 3.3–3.6 (615–816): iambic senarii (202 lines)

The witnesses explain that Collybiscus is a rich stranger they met at the harbour, who is looking for a place to stay and enjoy himself. Agorastocles comes out of his house in time to see Collybiscus paying the slave-dealer. After asking the witnesses for advice, he goes to Lycus's door. Lycus is just coming out, congratulating himself on the deal. Agorastocles requests him to send over Adelphasium, saying that he has sent a slave carrying the money. In front of the witnesses Lycus falls into the trap of denying that he has seen the slave or the money. Agorastocles fetches Collybiscus from Lycus's house for the witnesses to see, but finds that Lycus has run away. Agorastocles, Collybiscus, and the witnesses depart.

- Act 4.1 (817–822): iambic octonarii (4 lines), iambic septenarii (2 lines)

Milphio comes out into the street, singing how he gets a lot of beating because of his master's disturbed mood. He sees Lycus's servant Syncerastus coming out of the temple.

- Act 4.2 (823–922): trochaic septenarii (100 lines)

Milphio overhears Syncerastus complaining to himself about his wretched life working for Lycus. Syncerastus reveals that Lycus's temple sacrifice was not propitious. Milphio stops him and offers to help him. Syncerastus reveals that Adelphasium and her sister are actually free-born, captured by pirates in Carthage.

=== Hanno finds his daughters ===
- Act 5.1–5.3 (940–1173): Punic (10 lines); iambic senarii (222 lines)

Hanno, the Carthaginian father of the two girls, enters, speaking a prayer in Punic (Phoenician), which he then translates into Latin. He says he is carrying a token of hospitality which gives him the right to stay at the house of Agorastocles. Agorastocles and Milphio come out of their house, and, overheard by Hanno, talk about the two girls stolen from Carthage. Milphio recognises that Hanno and his attendants are Africans and questions him, pretending to understand his answers and inventing fanciful interpretations. Hanno then switches to Latin, to Milphio's embarrassment. Agorastocles welcomes Hanno as a fellow Carthaginian. Hanno shows Agorastocles the token and learns that he is the son of his cousin: the scar of a monkey-bite on Agorastocles' hand confirms his identity. Milphio seizes the opportunity to ask Hanno to help him in his plan. Hanno agrees, suspecting already that the girls are his own lost daughters. The girls' nurse is summoned from Lycus's house and recognises Hanno. Milphio takes Hanno's servants inside Agorastocles' house.

- Act 5.4 (1174–1200): polymetric (mainly anapaestic and iambic) (27 lines)

Adelphasium and her sister emerge from the temple, singing excitedly about the festival.

- Act 5.4 (cont.) (1201–1225): trochaic septenarii (25 lines)

The girls also talk of how a soothsayer promised that they would soon be free. Hanno stops them, and insists that they must come with him to a court.

- Act 5.4 (cont.) (1226–1273): iambic septenarii (48 lines)

The girls are puzzled. Hanno teasingly claims that they must be taken to court because they have stolen his daughters. At last Hanno reveals that he is their father. There is a happy reunion.

- Act 5.4 (cont.)–5.5 (1274–1303): trochaic septenarii (30 lines)

Hanno says a prayer of thanksgiving. Agorastocles reminds him that he had promised to betroth his eldest daughter to him.

The soldier Antamoenides comes out of Lycus's house, angry because he has been abandoned there without breakfast. He catches sight of Anterastilis hugging her father and becomes angry.

=== The end ===
- Act 5.5–5.6 (1304–1331): iambic senarii (26 lines)

Antamoenides angrily asks Hanno what business he has with her. Agorastocles and Antamoenides are about to start a fight, and Agorastocles summons his slaves, but Anterastilis defuses the situation by explaining. Suddenly they see Lycus returning to his house...

(The two endings below are probably not by Plautus.)

- Act 5.6 (end) (1334–1371): iambic senarii

Antamoenides and Hanno accost Lycus and both threaten to take him to court. He immediately gives in to their demands. He asks the audience to applaud.

(Alternative ending)

- Act 5.7 (1372–1397): iambic senarii

Lycus overhears Agorastocles explaining to Antamoenides about Hanno's daughters; he realises that he must surrender them. He begs Agorastocles for forgiveness and promises to make restitution.

- Act 5.7 (cont.) (1398–1422): trochaic septenarii

The soldier also demands his money back, and Lycus offers him a new girl. Hanno says that he will not go to court. Agorastocles declares that he will go back to Carthage with Hanno.

== Translations ==
- Henry Thomas Riley, 1912: Poenulus full text
- Paul Nixon, 1916–38
- Janet Burroway, 1970
- Amy Richlin, 2005
- Wolfgang de Melo, 2011

== See also ==
- Punic language § Sample text for an analysis of the Punic fragment.
