= Polyzalus =

Probable tyrant of Gela, brother of Gelon and Hiero I

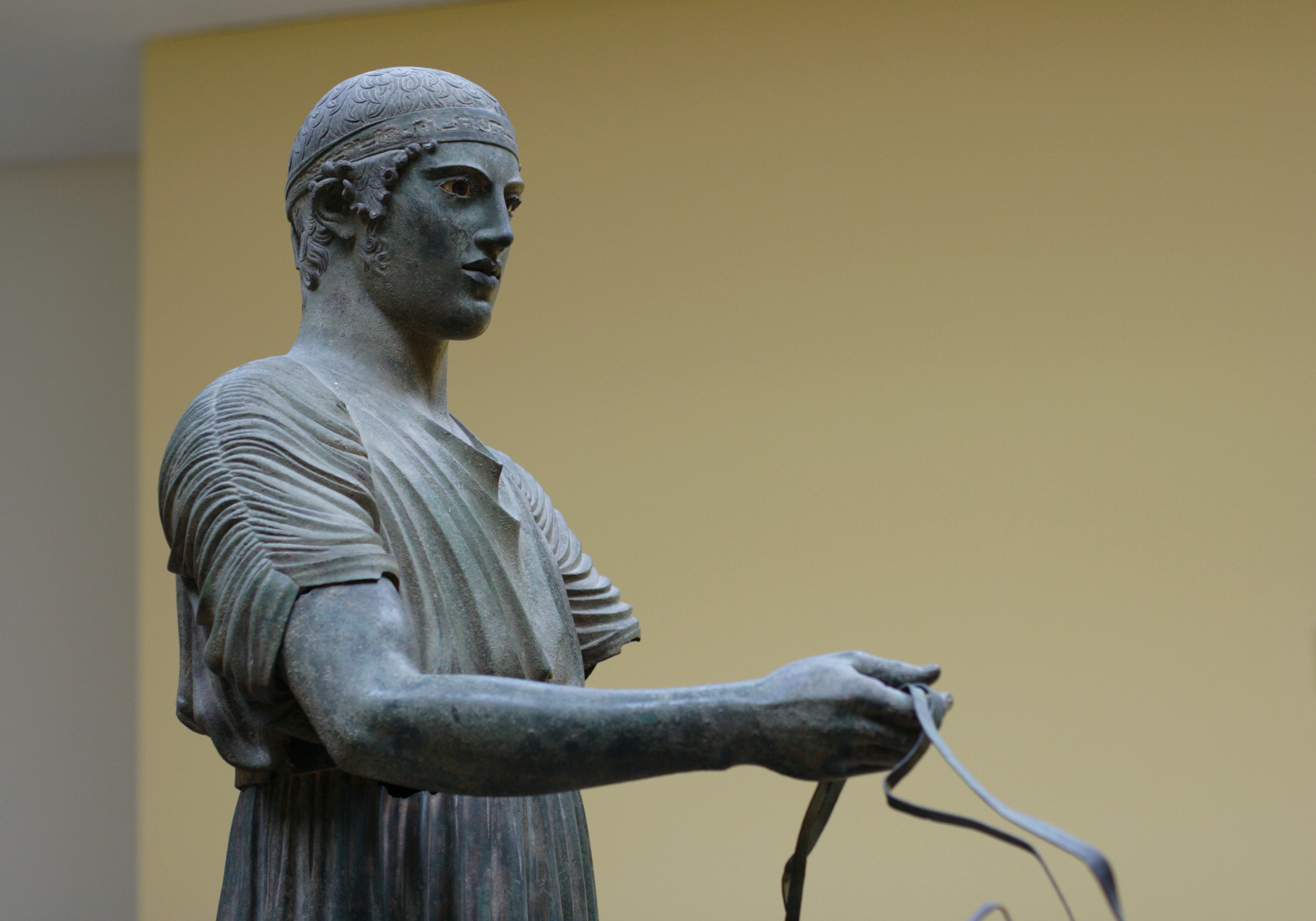
- The Charioteer of Delphi, associated with an inscription naming Polyzalus

Tyrant of Gela
- Reign: c. 478 – c. 476 BC
- Predecessor: Hiero
- Spouse: Damarete
- Issue: A daughter, wife of Theron of Acragas
- House: Deinomenid
- Father: Deinomenes

Polyzalus (Ancient Greek: Πολύζαλος, Polyzalos), also Polyzelus (Πολύζηλος, Polyzēlos) was a member of the Deinomenid family of Greek Sicily in the early 5th century BC, the brother of Gelon, Hiero and Thrasybulus. On Gelon's death in 478 BC he received Gelon's military command and his widow Damarete, daughter of Theron, tyrant of Acragas, and he probably ruled Gela as tyrant after Hiero moved to Syracuse. He soon fell out with Hiero, took refuge with Theron, and was restored to favor when the two rulers made peace, after which he disappears from the record.

== Family and succession ==
Polyzalus was one of the four sons of Deinomenes. Gelon ruled Gela from 491 to 485 BC, when he moved to Syracuse and left Gela to Hiero, who held it until 478 BC.

According to Diodorus Siculus, the dying Gelon "handed over the kingship to Hieron, his eldest brother". The historian Timaeus, quoted in the scholia to Pindar's Olympian 2, adds that by Gelon's instructions Polyzalus succeeded to his command of the army and to his wife, so that Theron's marriage tie with Gelon passed to him. Another scholion makes Theron himself give his daughter to Polyzalus, and Timaeus also records that Theron married a daughter of Polyzalus. Daniela Bonanno sees in this double marriage a plan to bind Gela and Acragas, which made Polyzalus rather than Hiero the heir to Gelon's alliance with Theron.

== Quarrel with Hiero ==
The ancient accounts of the breach between the brothers, which came to a head in 476 BC, differ. According to Diodorus, Hiero, fearing that his popular brother meant to seize the kingship, gave him command of an army sent to relieve Sybaris from Croton in the hope that he would be killed. Polyzalus refused the command and fled to Theron, and Hiero prepared for war against Acragas. In Timaeus' hostile version, Hiero sent Polyzalus against the Sybarites out of envy, Polyzalus won the war anyway, and Hiero then accused him of plotting revolution; Theron took up arms on behalf of his daughter and son-in-law, but the war went no further than the river Gelas, where the poet Simonides reconciled the two rulers. A third account, traced to Philistus, has Polyzalus sent against the non-Greek peoples of Sicily, most probably the Sicels; he broke off that war against Hiero's wishes, and Thrasydaeus, Theron's son, then urged him to move against his brother.

Diodorus ties the settlement to a crisis at Himera, whose citizens offered to betray their governor Thrasydaeus to Hiero. Hiero instead revealed the plot to Theron, who made peace with him and "restored Polyzelus to the favour he had previously enjoyed". According to the scholion, the peace was sealed by Hiero's marriage to a niece of Theron, which in Bonanno's view displaced Polyzalus as the link between the two dynasties and ended his political career.

== Rule at Gela ==
Most modern scholars conclude that Polyzalus ruled Gela, identifying him with the "ruler of Gela" of the Delphi inscription and noting that Thrasybulus, the youngest brother, was probably too young to have been given the city in 478 BC. Bonanno holds that Hiero left Gela to him on moving to Syracuse and that his rule ended with his flight to Acragas; Nino Luraghi placed it somewhat later, by 474 BC. Against this view, Herwig Maehler notes that "we do not even know for certain whether Polyzalos ever ruled Gela at all", and Gianfranco Adornato argues that the sources show him only as a military commander at Syracuse and that his identification with the "ruler of Gela" is "extremely improbable".

== Dedication at Delphi ==
In 1896 French excavators at Delphi found a limestone base block and, nearby, the lower part of the bronze Charioteer. The base preserves the right-hand halves of two hexameters. Traces of the erased first line, deciphered in 1909, name a "ruler of Gela" (Gelas anassōn) as dedicant; the recut line, in the Ionic alphabet, reads "Polyzalos dedicated me". The second line invokes Apollo. As transcribed by Maehler:

Original first line: – ◡◡ – ◡◡ – ◡ Γ]ΕΛΑΣ ΑΝΕ[Θ]ΕΚΕ[Ν] Α[Ν]ΑΣΣ[ΟΝ]
Recut first line: – ◡◡ – ◡◡ – ◡ Π]ΟΛΥΖΑΛΟΣ Μ ΑΝΕΘΗΚ[ΕΝ]
Second line: – ◡◡ – ◡◡ –]ΟΝ ΑΕΞ ΕΥΟΝΥΜ ΑΠΟΛΛ̣[ΟΝ]

The inscription does not mention a victory, and no literary source records one for Polyzalus. Most scholars have nevertheless followed François Chamoux in taking Polyzalus as the original dedicant, celebrating a chariot victory at the Pythian Games of 478 or 474 BC. The title was later erased, whether by the Geloans after the fall of the tyranny or, as Bonanno suggests, because he had ceased to rule the city. Sarah Harrell argues that the royal title anassōn broke with the restrained self-presentation of Gelon and Hiero in the Panhellenic sanctuaries, so that Polyzalus had "got it wrong".

Adornato, who assigns the original dedication to Gelon or Hiero, also dates the Charioteer on stylistic grounds to 470–450 BC and argues that it did not belong to this base.

== Later life ==
Nothing certain is known of Polyzalus after the reconciliation, and the date and circumstances of his death are unknown. When Hiero died around 467 BC, the rule of Syracuse passed not to Polyzalus but to Thrasybulus.

== Sources ==
- Adornato, Gianfranco (2008). "Delphic Enigmas? The Γέλας ἀνάσσων, Polyzalos, and the Charioteer Statue". American Journal of Archaeology. 112 (1): 29–55. JSTOR 40037243.
- Bonanno, Daniela (2010). Ierone il Dinomenide: storia e rappresentazione. Supplementi a Kokalos (in Italian). Vol. 21. Pisa and Rome: Fabrizio Serra. ISBN 978-88-6227-219-3.
- Chamoux, François (1955). L'Aurige. Fouilles de Delphes (in French). Vol. IV.5. Paris: De Boccard.
- Cummins, Monessa Finnerty (2010). "Sicilian Tyrants and Their Victorious Brothers II: The Deinomenids". The Classical Journal. 106 (1): 1–20. doi:10.5184/classicalj.106.1.0001.
- Dimauro, Elisabetta (2024). "Diodorus, Sch. Pi. O. 2.29c, and the End of the Emmenids". Gerión. Revista de Historia Antigua. 42 (2): 407–420. doi:10.5209/geri.95427.
- Drachmann, A. B., ed. (1903). Scholia vetera in Pindari carmina (in Ancient Greek and Latin). Vol. 1: Scholia in Olympionicas. Leipzig: Teubner.
- Harrell, Sarah E. (2002). "King or Private Citizen: Fifth-Century Sicilian Tyrants at Olympia and Delphi". Mnemosyne. Fourth Series. 55 (4): 439–464. JSTOR 4433352.
- Luraghi, Nino (1994). Tirannidi arcaiche in Sicilia e Magna Grecia: da Panezio di Leontini alla caduta dei Dinomenidi (in Italian). Florence: Olschki.
- Maehler, Herwig (2002). "Bakchylides and the Polyzalos Inscription". Zeitschrift für Papyrologie und Epigraphik. 139: 19–21. JSTOR 20191404.
