= 498 BC =

498 BC in various calendars
- Gregorian calendar: 498 BC; CDXCVIII BC
- Ab urbe condita: 256
- Ancient Egypt era: XXVII dynasty, 28
- Pharaoh: Darius I of Persia, 24
- Ancient Greek Olympiad (summer): 70th Olympiad, year 3
- Assyrian calendar: 4253
- Balinese saka calendar: N/A
- Bengali calendar: −1091 – −1090
- Berber calendar: 453
- Buddhist calendar: 47
- Burmese calendar: −1135
- Byzantine calendar: 5011–5012
- Chinese calendar: 壬寅年 (Water Tiger); 2200 or 1993 — to — 癸卯年 (Water Rabbit); 2201 or 1994
- Coptic calendar: −781 – −780
- Discordian calendar: 669
- Ethiopian calendar: −505 – −504
- Hebrew calendar: 3263–3264
- Hindu calendars
- Vikram Samvat: −441 – −440
- Shaka Samvat: N/A
- Kali Yuga: 2603–2604
- Holocene calendar: 9503
- Iranian calendar: 1119 BP – 1118 BP
- Islamic calendar: 1153 BH – 1152 BH
- Javanese calendar: N/A
- Julian calendar: N/A
- Korean calendar: 1836
- Minguo calendar: 2409 before ROC 民前2409年
- Nanakshahi calendar: −1965
- Thai solar calendar: 45–46
- Tibetan calendar: ཆུ་ཕོ་སྟག་ལོ་ (male Water-Tiger) −371 or −752 or −1524 — to — ཆུ་མོ་ཡོས་ལོ་ (female Water-Hare) −370 or −751 or −1523

Year 498 BC was a year of the pre-Julian Roman calendar. At the time, it was known as the Year of the Consulship of Siculus and Flavus (or, less frequently, year 256 Ab urbe condita). The denomination 498 BC for this year has been used since the early medieval period, when the Anno Domini calendar era became the prevalent method in Europe for naming years.

== Events ==
=== By place ===
==== Greece ====
- Alexander I succeeds his father Amyntas I as king of Macedonia.
- Athens and Eretria respond to the Ionian plea for help against Persia and send troops. An Athenian and Eretrian fleet transports Athenian troops to Ephesus. There they are joined by a force of Ionians and march upon Sardis, the capital of Artaphernes (the satrap of Lydia and brother to Darius I of Persia). Artaphernes, who has sent most of his troops to besiege Miletus, is taken by surprise. However, Artaphernes is able to retreat to the citadel and hold it. Although the Greeks are unable to take the citadel, they pillage the town and set fires that burn Sardis to the ground.
- Retreating to the coast, the Greek forces are met by the Persians under Artaphernes and defeated in the Battle of Ephesus.
- Kaunos and Caria, followed by Byzantium and towns in the Hellespont also revolt against the Persians. Cyprus also joins the rebellion, as Onesilus removes his pro-Persian brother, Gorgos, from the throne of Salamis.

==== Sicily ====
- After the assassination of Cleander, tyrant of Gela, power is transferred to his brother, Hippocrates, who subdues the Sicels and conquers the Chalcidian cities of Callipoli, Leontini, Naxos and Zancle (now known as Messina). He also captures the Syracusan city of Camarina, but is prevented from capturing Syracuse itself when Corinth and Corcyra interferes in the war.

=== By topic ===
==== Literature ====
- The Greek poet Pindar composes his earliest surviving epinikion (Pythian ode 10).

== Deaths ==
- Amyntas I, king of Macedonia, died c. 498 BC (b. c. 540 BC)
- Cleander, tyrant of Gela, assassinated c. 498 BC
