= Deinomenes =

6th-century BC father of several tyrants of Syracuse

Deinomenes was the father of Hieron I, Gelo (or Gelon), Thrasyboulos, and Polyzalus. The historian Herodotus writes that his ancestors came from the island of Telos in the Aegean Sea and were the founders of the city of Gela in southern Sicily, Magna Graecia. One of his ancestors, Telines, was made 'high priest of the gods who dwell below', a role which carried on through his descendants.

Deinomenes consulted the Delphic oracle about the fates of his children, and was told that Gelo, Hieron and Thrasyboulos were all destined, to their sorrow, to become tyrants.

== Bibliography ==
- Herodotus. Rawlinson, George (ed.). Histories.
- Pindar. Pythian Odes.
- Plutarch. De Pythiae oraculis.
