= Olympian 3 =

Olympian 3, 'For Theron of Acragas', is an ode by the 5th century BC Greek poet Pindar.

== Background ==
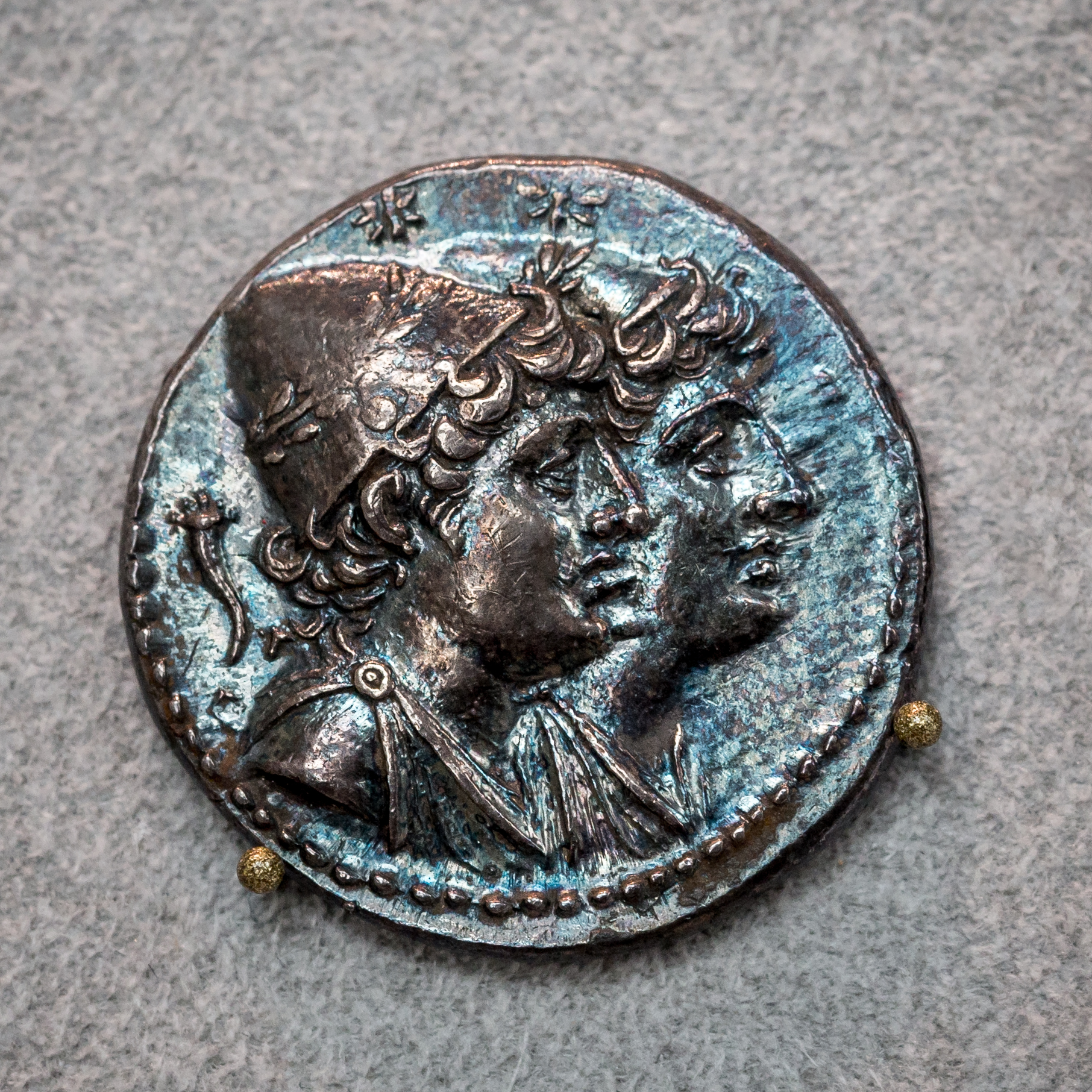
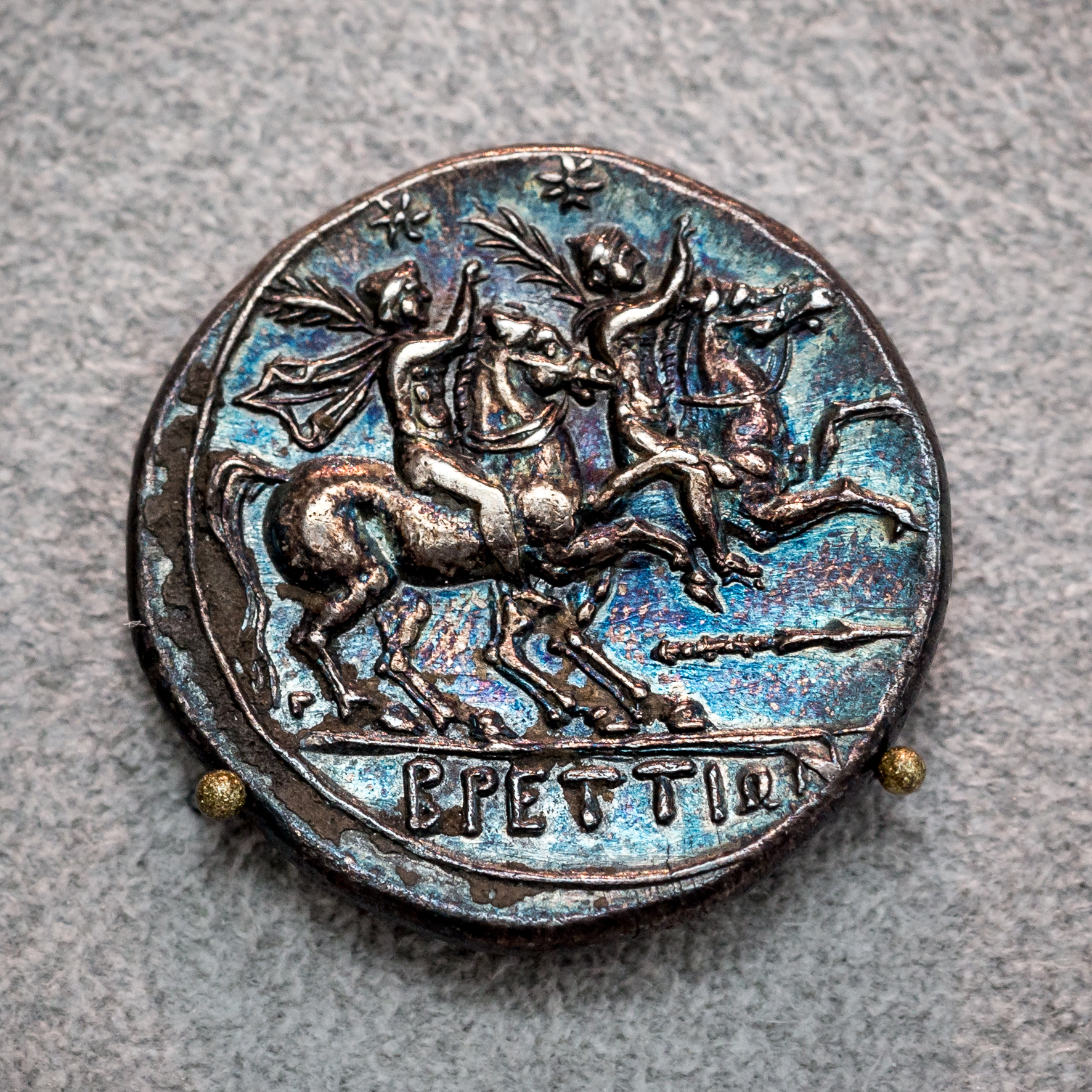
Silver didrachm of the Brettioi, 216–203 BC. Castor and Polydeuces

The third Olympian celebrates the same victory as the second (that of 476), but, while the former Ode was probably sung in the palace of Theron, the present was performed in the temple of the Dioscuri at Acragas, on the occasion of the festival of the Theoxenia, when the gods were deemed to be entertained by Castor and Polydeuces.

== Summary ==
Acragas and Theron are commended to the favour of the Twin Brethren and their sister Helen (1–4). The Muse has prompted the poet to invent a new type of Dorian song, to be sung to the accompaniment of the lyre and the flute (4–9). He was also summoned to sing by Pisa, whence odes of victory are sent to all whom the umpire crowns with the olive, which Heracles brought back from the Hyperboreans to the treeless Olympia (9–34).

Heracles is now attending the Theoxenia with the Twin Brethren, whom he caused to preside over the Olympic Games (34–38). Theron's glory is a favour granted in return for his pious worship of the Twin Gods (38–41). Even as water and gold are supreme in their kind, so Theron's exploits reach the Pillars of Heracles.

== Sources ==
Attribution:

- Sandys, John, ed. (1915). The Odes of Pindar, including the Principal Fragments. Loeb Classical Library. New York: The Macmillan Co. pp. 31–9.
