= 498th =

498th may refer to:

- 498th Bombardment Squadron, inactive United States Air Force unit
- 498th Fighter-Interceptor Squadron, inactive United States Air Force unit
- 498th Nuclear Systems Wing (498 NSW), wing of the United States Air Force based at Kirtland Air Force Base, New Mexico
- 498th paratroopers battalion, Romanian Land Forces brigade formed on 25 October 2011

== See also ==
- 498 (number)
- 498, the year 498 (CDXCVIII) of the Julian calendar
- 498 BC
