= François Chamoux =

French historian of Ancient Greece

- Born: 4 April 1915; Mirecourt (Vosges)
- Died: 21 October 2007 (aged 92); Paris
- Occupation: Hellenist

François Chamoux (4 April 1915 – 21 October 2007) was a French Hellenist and archaeologist, a member of the Académie des inscriptions et belles-lettres.

== Biography ==
Chamoux attended lyceums in Chartres and Metz and the Lycée Henri IV in Paris and studied from 1934 at the École Normale Supérieure and was Agrégé des lettres in classical languages in 1938. After that, he served in World War II (where he received the Silver Croix de Guerre) and in 1941 was severely wounded. Between 1943 and 1948 he was a student at the French School at Athens. Subsequently, he served as an assistant at the University of Lille and the Sorbonne and teacher in a Parisian high school (lycée). In 1952 he was awarded his doctorate at the Sorbonne for his thesis dedicated to Cyren under the Battiadae and the Charioteer of Delphi and was subsequently professor at Nancy and from 1960 to 1983 Professor of Greek literature and civilization at the Sorbonne.

He also wrote overviews for Greek culture and art history and a biography of Mark Antony. He was both an excellent connoisseur of Greek art and ancient Greek poetry (especially epigrams). As Homer connoisseur, he regularly attended the symposia in Chios.

He did a lot of excavations in Greece (already in his time at the École francaise in Athens in the 1940s), among others in Delphi, Thasos, and the colonies of Kyrene in Libya .

From 1981 he was a member of the Académie des Inscriptions et Belles-Lettres and from 1974 to 1987 he was editor of the Revue des Études grecques.

== See also ==
- Mosaics of Delos

== Selected publications ==
- François Chamoux, Cyrène sous la monarchie des Battiades (« Bibliothèque des Écoles françaises d'Athènes et de Rome », 177), Paris, De Boccard, 1953, 480 p., 28 pl. (thèse).
- Chamoux, François (1963). La Civilisation grecque de l'époque archaïque et classique (in-octavo, 229 héliogravures, 8 planches en couleurs, 34 cartes et plans). Les Grandes Civilisations (in French). Paris: Arthaud. OCLC 459707008.
- Chamoux, François (1981). La Civilisation hellénistique. Les Grandes Civilisations (in French). Paris: Arthaud. ISBN 2-7003-0374-1. OCLC 300399135.
- François Chamoux, Marc-Antoine, dernier prince de l'Orient, Paris, Arthaud, 1986.

== Honors and awards ==
- Commander of the Order of Legion of Honour
- Croix de guerre 1939-1945
- Commander of the Ordre des Arts et des Lettres
