= Thrasydaeus =

Tyrant of Agrigentum from 473 to 472 BC

Thrasydaeus (Ancient Greek: Θρασυδαῖος), tyrant of Agrigentum in Magna Graecia, was the son and successor of Theron. Already during his father's lifetime he had been appointed to the government of Himera, where, by his violent and arbitrary conduct, he alienated the citizens, so that they were close to revolt. But when they sought support from Hiero of Syracuse, he betrayed them to Theron, who then put to death the leaders of the disaffected party and re-established his authority. Whether Thrasydaeus retained his position at Himera after this is unknown; but on the death of Theron (473 BC) he succeeded without opposition to rule both cities. His tyrannical and violent character soon displayed itself, and made him as unpopular at Agrigentum as he had been at Himera. But his first object was to renew the war with Hiero, against whom he had already taken an active part during his father's lifetime. He therefore assembled a large force of mercenaries, besides a general levy from Agrigentum and Himera, and advanced against Hiero, but was defeated after a stubborn and bloody struggle. The Agrigentines immediately took advantage of this disaster to expel him from their city. He made his escape to Greece, but was arrested at Megara, and publicly executed.

== Notes ==
Preceded by: Theron	Tyrant of Agrigentum; 473 BC - 472 BC	Succeeded by: democracy
