= Olympian 2 =

Olympian 2, 'For Theron of Acragas', is an ode by the 5th century BC Greek poet Pindar.

== Background ==
Under Theron and his brother Xenocrates, Acragas, a Greek colony of Gela, was brought to the height of its glory. The brothers were descended from the Emmenidae, who were descended from Cadmus. They were allied to the rulers of Syracuse, Damareta, daughter of Theron, having successively married Gelon and his younger brother, Polyzelus, while Theron had already married a daughter of Polyzelus, and Hieron had married a daughter of Xenocrates.

Theron became tyrant of Acragas about 488, and conquered Himera in 482. The tyrant of Himera appealed to his son-in-law Anaxilas, tyrant of Rhegium, who called in the aid of the Carthaginians, whom Theron and his son-in-law, Gelon of Syracuse, defeated at Himera in 480. In 476 Theron won the chariot-race at Olympia, which is celebrated in this ode. The date is recorded in the Oxyrhynchus papyrus.

== Summary ==
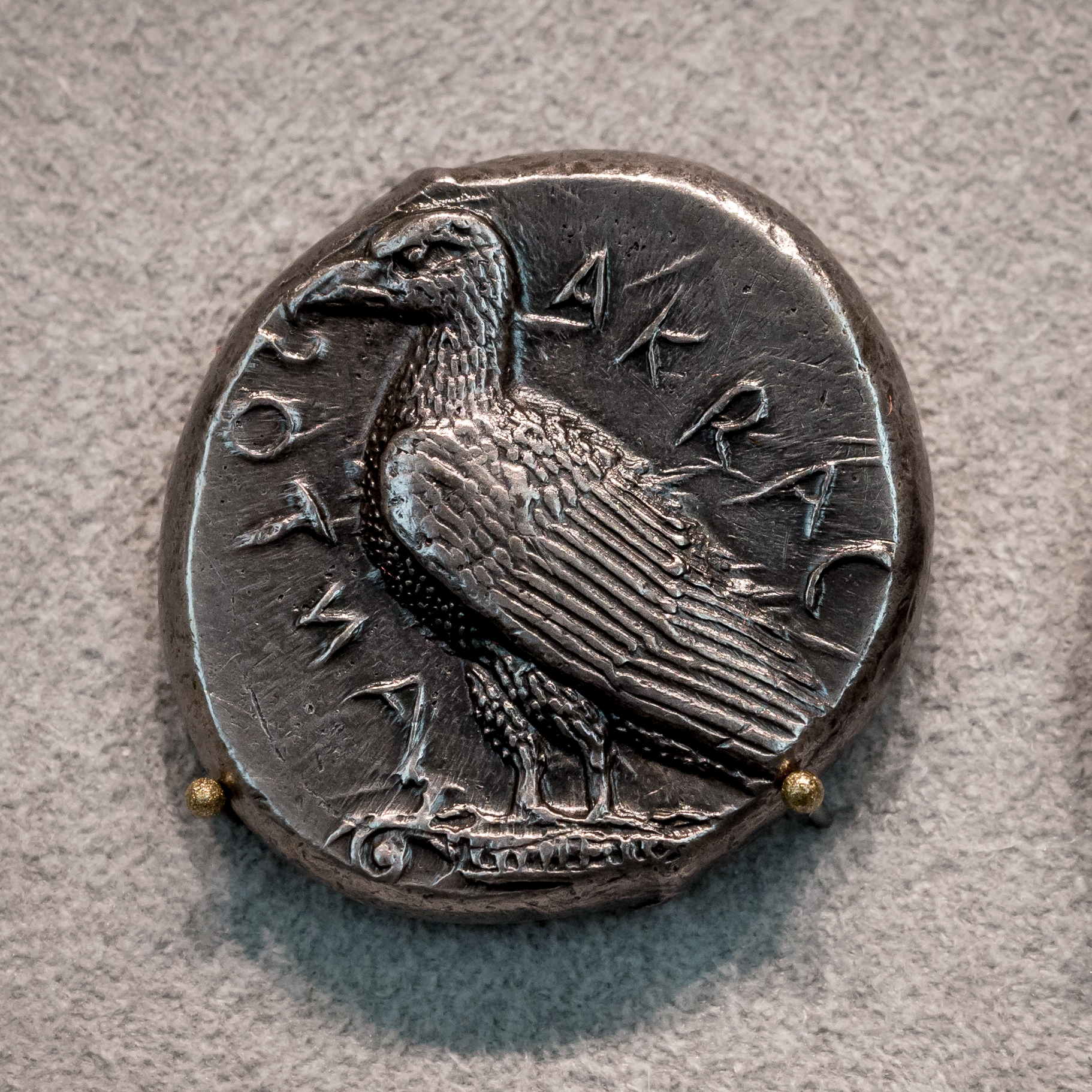
Silver tetradrachm of Acragas, 5th cent. BC. Eagle facing left

The God, the hero, and the man, we celebrate, shall be Zeus, the lord of Pisa, Heracles, the founder of the Olympic games, and the victor Theron (1–6). Theron's famous ancestors had settled and prospered in Sicily, and Zeus is prayed to continue their prosperity (6-15). But prosperity leads to forgetfulness of troubles, as is proved by the family of Cadmus, from which Theron himself is descended (15–47). He and his brother have an hereditary claim to victory in the Greek games (48–51). Victory gives release from trouble (51 f.).

Glory may be won by wealth combined with virtue; while the unjust are punished, the just live in the Islands of the Blest, with Cadmus and Achilles (53–83).

The poet is like an eagle, while his detractors are like crows, but their cavil cannot prevail against the poet's praise (83–88). Theron is the greatest benefactor that Acragas has had for a hundred years; though his fame is attacked by envy, his bounties are as countless as the sand of the sea (89–100).

== Sources ==
- Grenfell, Bernard P., ed. (1899). The Oxyrhynchus Papyri. Vol. 2. Oxford: Oxford University Press. p. 88.

Attribution:

- Sandys, John, ed. (1915). The Odes of Pindar, including the Principal Fragments. Loeb Classical Library. New York: The Macmillan Co. pp. 16–29.
