= Gelon =

Tyrant of Syracuse (died 478 BC)

- Greek tyrant of Gela and Syracuse
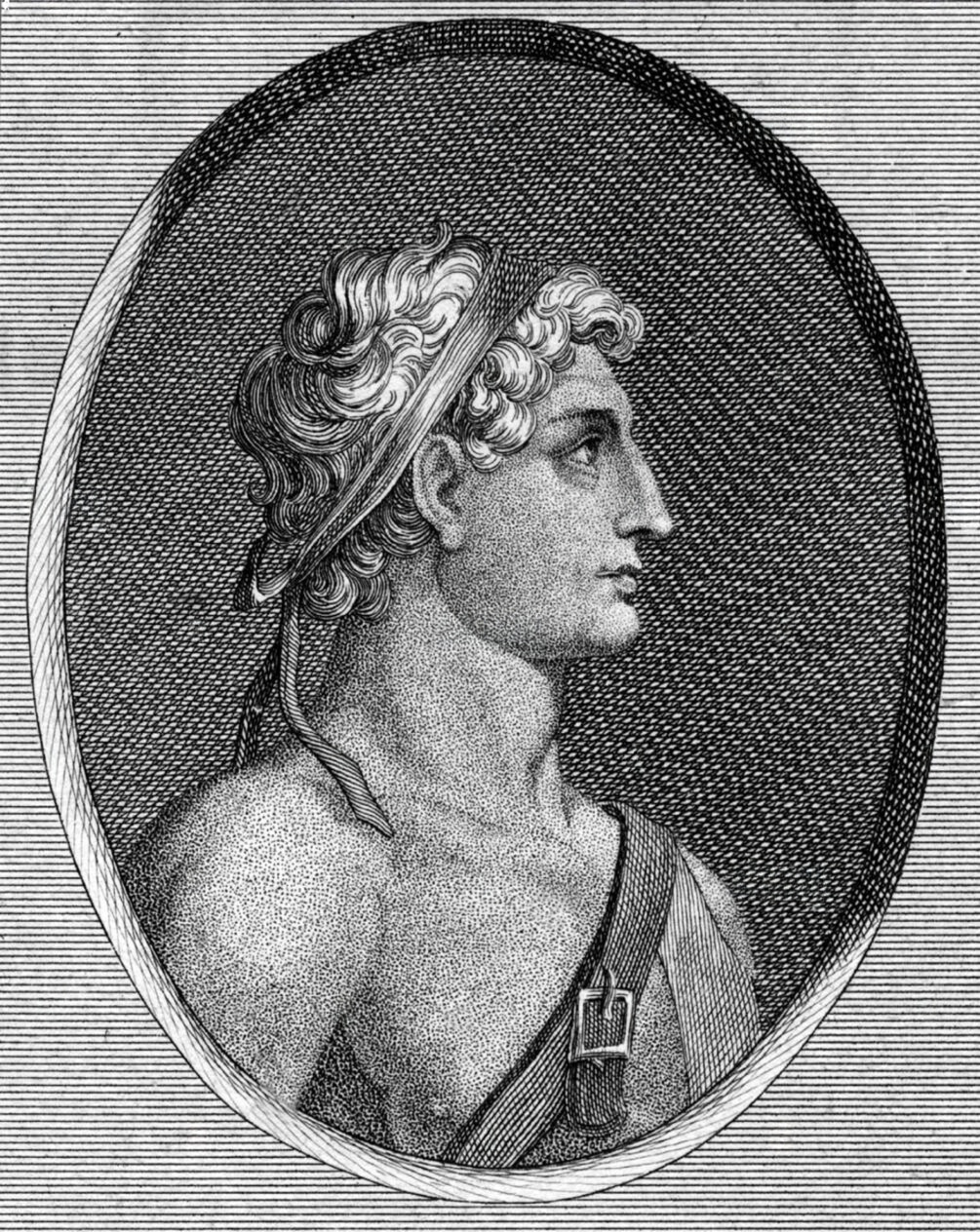
- Portrait from Chronologisch geordneter Bildniss-Saal (1833) by Mark Karl Baldamus
- Reign: Tyrant of Gela: 491 – 485 BC; Tyrant of Syracuse: 485 – 478 BC
- Predecessor: Hippocrates
- Successor: Hiero I
- Born: c. 540 BC; Gela
- Died: 478 BC; Syracuse
- Family: Deinomenid
- Father: Deinomenes
- Religion: Greek Polytheism

Gelon (Ancient Greek: Γέλων; Sicilian: Jiluni, Giluni; c. 540–478 BC), son of Deinomenes, was a Greek tyrant of the Sicilian cities Gela and Syracuse, first of the Deinomenid rulers.

== Early life ==
Gelon was the son of Deinomenes. According to Herodotus, Gelon's ancestors came from the island of Telos in the Aegean Sea and were the founders of the city of Gela in southern Sicily. One of his later ancestors, Telines, was said to have reconciled his people after a period of civil strife through the divine rites of the Earth Goddesses; Herodotus infers that all of Telines' descendants, including Gelon, were priests of this cult.

Gelon's three brothers were Hieron, Thrasybulus and Polyzalus. Deinomenes consulted an oracle about the fates of his children and was told that Gelon, Hieron, and Thrasybulus were all destined to become tyrants.

Gelon fought in a number of the conflicts between the various tyrant kings of Sicily and earned a reputation as a formidable soldier. His performance was so impressive that he was promoted to be commander of the cavalry for his uncle Hippocrates, tyrant of Gela. From this position, he played a key role in a number of battles, including one against Syracuse, a city which he himself would later conquer.

== Rise to power ==
Gelon's rise to power began when Hippocrates was killed in a battle with the native Sicel tribe of Sicily at Hybla. After Hippocrates' death, his sons retained the throne, but the common people grew tired of the family's rule and revolted. Gelon quelled the revolt on the pretext of helping Hippocrates' sons gain power. Instead, he took power for himself with the help of the army in 491 BC. The territory now under his control as tyrant included that of Gela, Naxos in the east, Zancle in the northeast, and Camarina in the south.

== Tyrant of Syracuse ==
Gelon ruled over Gela and his other territories in eastern Sicily peacefully for the next five years. In 485 BC, the aristocracy of Syracuse called the Gamori, whom the common people had forced out of the city, came to Gelon seeking his aid. Seeing an opportunity for expansion, Gelon used his now-large military force to capture Syracuse with little or no resistance, reinstating the exiled Gamori.

Gelon now ruled as the new tyrant of Syracuse and left his brother Hiero to rule over Gela. According to Herodotus, he forced half the citizens of Gela to move to Syracuse. Similarly, he removed all the aristocracy from Camarina.

He continued this strategy as he conquered nearby Euboea and Megara Hyblaea (483 BC), forcibly removing the aristocracy from each city and placing the rest of the population in slavery. According to Herodotus, because he was raised as a noble and was constantly in the presence of nobility, Gelon did not care for the lower class, and "found the common people unpleasant to share a house with".

Under Gelon's rule, Syracuse soon became prosperous. Along with a grand building program, Gelon also sought to create a powerful mercenary army. Most of the recruits for his army came from the native Sicel tribes. However, some were recruited from the Greek mainland, men who had most likely fought with Gelon at some point in the past, and their total number was said to be around 10,000. All of these men were granted citizenship of Syracuse.

Gelon found a powerful ally in Theron, tyrant of Acragas, a city west of Gela, after he married Theron's daughter, Demareta. In 481 BC, representatives of Athens came to him asking for his aid in the upcoming war against Xerxes I and his Persian army. Gelon replied that he could supply 28,000 men and 200 ships if he were appointed commander of either the Greek navy or army. He was denied both positions and, therefore, refused to supply the Greeks with any supplies or men. In fact, he even prepared gifts for Xerxes in case the Persian king won his war against the Greek alliance.

Among Gelon's forces offered to the Athenians there was a large proportion of cavalry and light troops, including archers and slingers, which suggests military science had achieved a higher level under Gelon than in Athens and Sparta.

== Battle of Himera ==
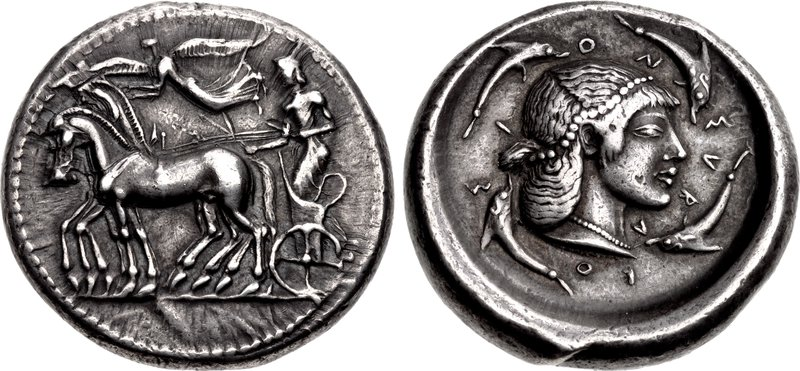
Silver coin of Gelon, struck at the Syracuse mint, dated 480-478 BC. Obv: Charioteer and horses, goddess Nike flying above. Rev: Head of Arethusa, encircled by four dolphins.

His unwillingness to support the Greeks could have been related to the threat posed by the Carthaginians on the west coast of Sicily. Theron of Acragas jeopardized Sicily's independence from the powerful Carthaginians when he defeated the tyrant Terillus at Himera. Seeking a powerful ally to assist in recapturing Himera, Terillus went to Carthage for assistance. The Carthaginians were happy to respond to his plea. The Carthaginians were keen to increase their influence and territory in Sicily, and the opportunity came at a perfect time because of the coming Persian invasion of Greece.

Some scholars argue that Xerxes and the Carthaginians were in contact and coordinated a simultaneous attack on both the western and eastern fronts of Greece and its colonies, hoping to prevent either front from aiding the other. In any case, in 480 BC a Carthaginian force of 300,000 men landed at Panormus on the north coast of Sicily and advanced east towards Himera, led by their general Hamilcar. Upon hearing the danger his ally Theron faced, Gelon led an army of 50,000 men and 5,000 cavalry to Himera.

A contingent of Gelon's men gained access to the Carthaginian camp by posing as allies from the nearby city of Selinus. Once inside, they signaled to the rest of Gelon's troops, who were stationed in the mountains overlooking the camp, by setting fire to Hamilcar's ships. The ensuing battle was a decisive victory for Gelon and Theron, with Carthaginian casualties estimated at 150,000, including Hamilcar.

Gelon dispersed the riches collected from the Carthaginian camp, along with the 2,000 talents of silver from the peace treaty with Carthage, among his troops and allies, with a large portion designated for the construction of a new temple in Syracuse. According to Herodotus, upon his return to his capital, Gelon organized a meeting with the people of Syracuse, and described to them his actions during the war with Hamilcar, and the manner in which he dispersed the spoils. He told them that if they found anything wrong in his conduct, they were free to kill him and take control of Syracuse for themselves. The people of Syracuse decided to keep Gelon as their tyrant, and he continued his reign in peace for the next two years.

== Death and succession ==
Gelon died in 478 BC after ruling Syracuse for seven years. Control of his kingdom passed to his brother Hieron, who ruled for the next 10 years until his death, when a dispute over who should inherit the crown led to the dissolution of the Syracusan state.

== Sources ==
- Bury, J. B.; Meiggs, Russell (1975) [first published 1900]. A History of Greece (Fourth ed.). London: MacMillan Press. ISBN 0-333-15492-4.
- Herodotus (1975) [first published 1954]. Burn, A. R.; de Sélincourt, Aubrey (eds.). The Histories. London: Penguin Books. ISBN 0-14-051260-8.
- Bury, John B. History of Greece to the Death of Alexander the Great. Macmillan, 1922. 298–303.
- Freeman, Edward A. The History of Sicily from the Earliest Times : From the beginning of Greek settlement to the beginning of Athenian intervention. Vol. 2. At the Clarendon P, 1891. 122–33.
- "Gelon." Encyclopædia Britannica. 2008. Encyclopædia Britannica Online School Edition. 4 December 2008 <http://school.eb.com/eb/article-9036333>.
- Hart, John. Herodotus and Greek History. Taylor & Francis, 1982. 62.
- Munn, Mark H. The Mother of the Gods, Athens, and the Tyranny of Asia : A Study of Sovereignty in Ancient Religion. New York: University of California P, 2006. 91–92.
- Oman, Charles. A History of Greece from the Earliest Times to the Death of Alexander the Great. Longmans, Green, and Co., 1901. 232–34.
- John Julius Norwich. Sicily: An Island At The Crossroads Of History. Random House, NY, 2015. 6–10.
- Rollin, Charles. The Ancient History of the Egyptians, Carthaginians, Assyrians, Babylonians, Medes and Persians, Macedonians and Grecians. Vol. 2. J.B. Lippincott & Co., 1869. 171–73.
- Smith, William. A Dictionary of Greek and Roman Biography and Mythology : Earinus-Nyx. Vol. 2. J. Murray, 1876. 236–37.
- Thirlwall, Connop. A History of Greece. Vol. 1. New York, NY: Harper and Brothers, 1860. 225.
- Chisholm, Hugh, ed. (1911). "Gelo" . Encyclopædia Britannica. Vol. 11 (11th ed.). Cambridge University Press. p. 559.

| Preceded by: Hippocrates | Tyrant of Gela; 491 BC – 485 BC | Succeeded by: Hieron I |
| Preceded by: - | Tyrant of Syracuse; 485 BC – 478 BC | Succeeded by: Hieron I |
