= Cleander of Gela =

Tyrant of the Sicilian city of Gela from c. 505 to 498 BC

Cleander (Ancient Greek: Κλέανδρος) was a tyrant who ruled the Sicilian city of Gela, Magna Graecia, which had previously been subject to an oligarchy. He founded the Pantarid dynasty, reigning for seven years, and was murdered in 498 BC by a citizen of Gela named Sabyllus who wanted to see the introduction of democracy in the city. Instead power was transferred to Cleander’s brother, Hippocrates of Gela.

It has been suggested that Cleander was responsible for building Gela's first city wall due to a problematic relationship with the native Sicels, a situation thought to have been caused by Cleander himself.

== Notes ==
Preceded by: —	Tyrant of Gela; 505 BC – 498 BC	Succeeded by: Hippocrates
