= Hippocrates of Gela =

Greek Sicilian tyrant of Gela from 498 to 491 BC

Hippocrates (Greek: Ἱπποκράτης; died 491 BC) was the second tyrant of Gela, Magna Graecia, and ruled from 498 BC to 491 BC. He was the brother of Cleander and succeeded him to the throne after his death in 498. With him, Gela began its expansion phase; Hippocrates aimed to conquer all of southeastern Sicily in order to build a great state with Gela as its capital. He formed an alliance with Agrigento and conquered Zancle, Camarina, Catana, Naxos and Leontini. He also managed to besiege Syracuse, but had to withdraw, due to Corinthian and Corcyran involvement in the war. During his government, his city became the most powerful and flourishing among the Greek colonies in Sicily. Hippocrates died in battle against the Sicels. He designated his sons, Euclides and Cleander, as his successors, but they were soon replaced by the commander of the cavalry, Gelo who became the new tyrant of Gela.

Preceded by: Cleander	Tyrant of Gela; 498 BC – 491 BC	Succeeded by: Gelo
