= Charioteer of Delphi =

Ancient bronze sculpture

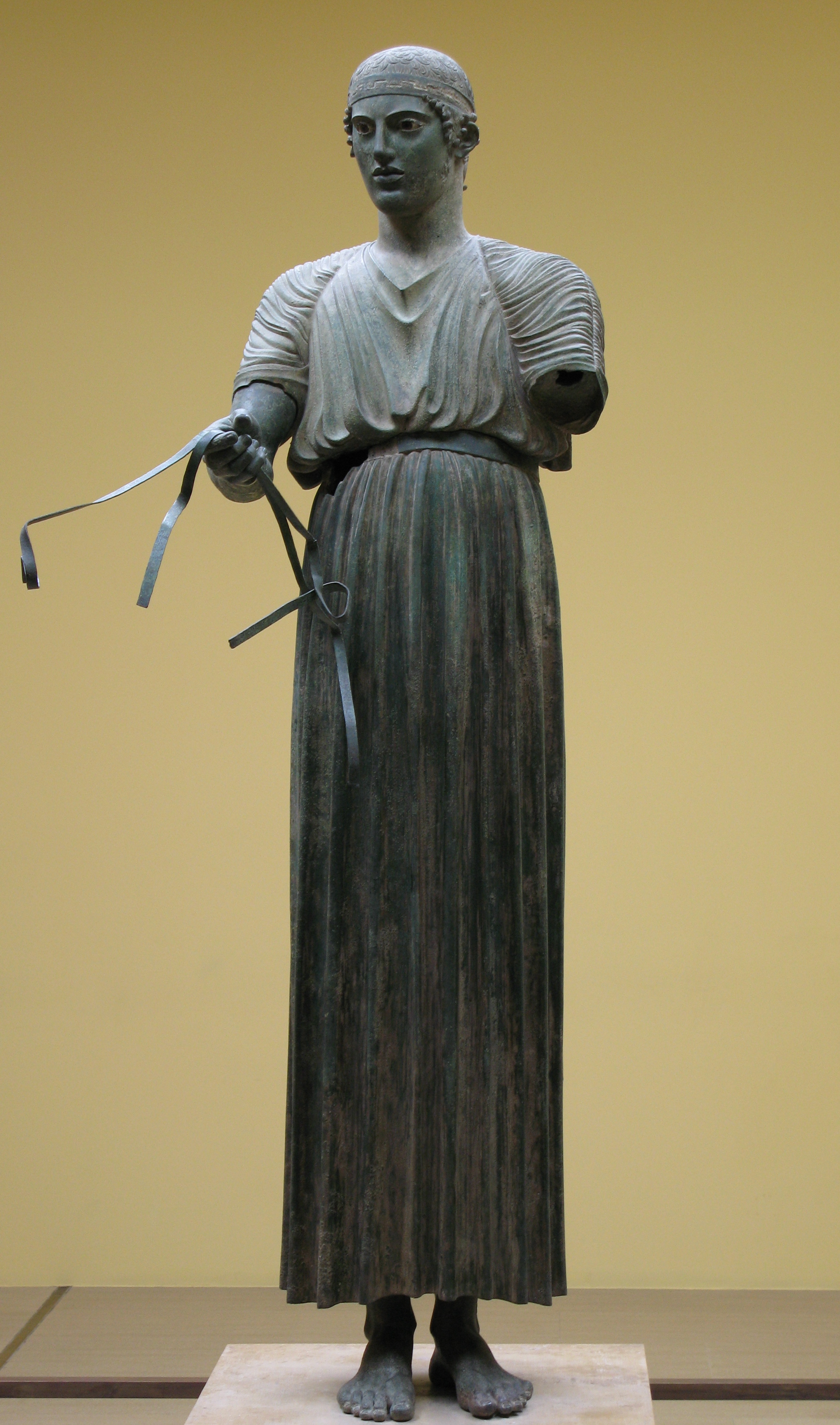
The Charioteer of Delphi, Delphi Museum

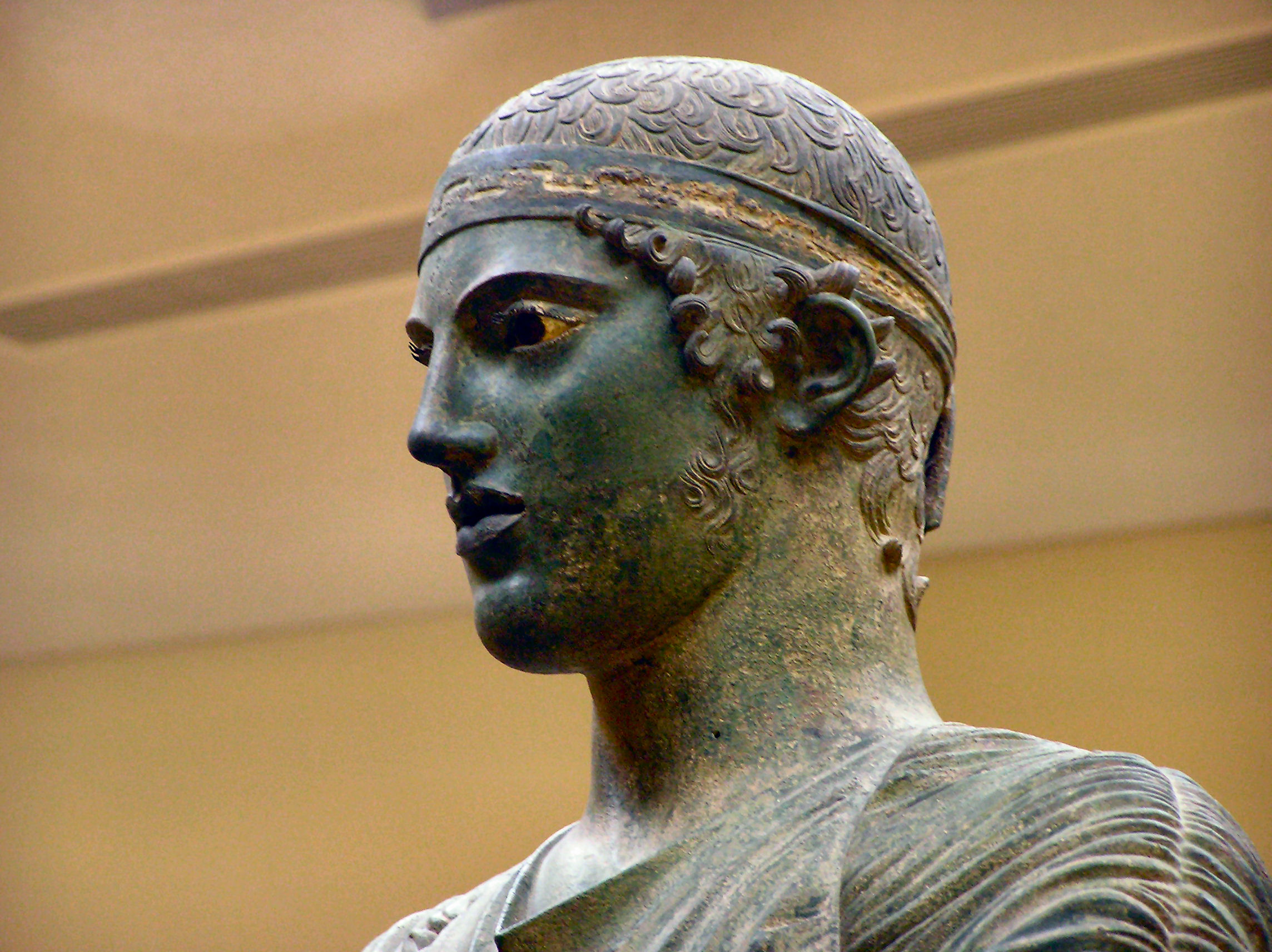
Charioteer of Delphi, head

The Charioteer of Delphi, also known as Heniokhos (Greek: Ἡνίοχος, the rein-holder), is an ancient Greek bronze statue dating to around 470 BC. Standing 1.8 meters tall, the life-size figure of a chariot driver was originally part of a larger sculptural group that included a chariot, horses, and child attendants, fragments of which were also uncovered among the ruins. The work was dedicated at the Sanctuary of Apollo at Delphi, one of the most important religious sites of the Greek world, to commemorate a victory in the panhellenic Pythian Games, which featured both athletic and equestrian competitions.

The figure represents a young noble, or ephebe, wearing a characteristic sleeved tunic. He is shown after the race has ended, during the victory parade, wearing the champion's headband. His head is turned slightly to the right, and his hands are modeled with great detail, with the fingers still curved around the reins. Unlike many other artworks from the sanctuary that were looted or destroyed, it survived because it had been buried in the debris of the great earthquake of 373 BC.

The statue was discovered in 1896 during excavations at Delphi. Today it is considered one of the finest surviving examples of the Severe style, dominant in the Greek world between 490 and 450 BC. Its naturalistic rendering of the human form, combined with a restrained, dignified expression, illustrates the transition from the stylized Archaic kouros figures to the more realistic representations of the Classical period. The statue is housed today in the Delphi Archaeological Museum.

== Background ==
The statue was erected at Delphi, Greece to commemorate one of two victories of the tyrant Polyzalus of Gela in Sicily and his chariot in the Pythian Games of either 478 or 474 BC, which were held at Delphi in honor of Pythean Apollo. It has also been suggested that the complex was instead built to commemorate the victory of Polyzalos' brother, Hieron, at the same games, in analogy to his ex voto after his victory at the Olympic Games.

It was originally part of a larger group of statuary, including the chariot, at least four horses and possibly two grooms. Some fragments of the horses were found with the statue. The masterpiece has been associated with the sculptor Pythagoras of Rhegion, who lived and worked in Sicily, Magna Graecia, as well as with the sculptor Calamis. The Sicilian cities were very wealthy compared with most of mainland Greece, and their rulers could afford magnificent offerings to the gods, as well as the best horses and drivers. However, it is unlikely that the statue originates from Sicily. Though the name of the sculptor is unknown, it stylistically resembles statues cast in Athens, such as the Piraeus Apollo, which is known to be of Athenian origin.

An inscription on the limestone base of the statue indicates that it was dedicated by Polyzalus, the tyrant of Gela, a Greek colony in Sicily, as a tribute to Apollo for helping him to win the chariot race. The inscription, which is written in hexameter, reads: [...Π]ολύζαλος μ'ἀνέθηκ[ε... τ]ὸν ἄεξ εὐόνυμ'Ἀπόλλ[ον], which is reconstructed to read "Polyzalus dedicated me. ... Make him prosper, honoured Apollo."

== Design and completeness ==
External videos
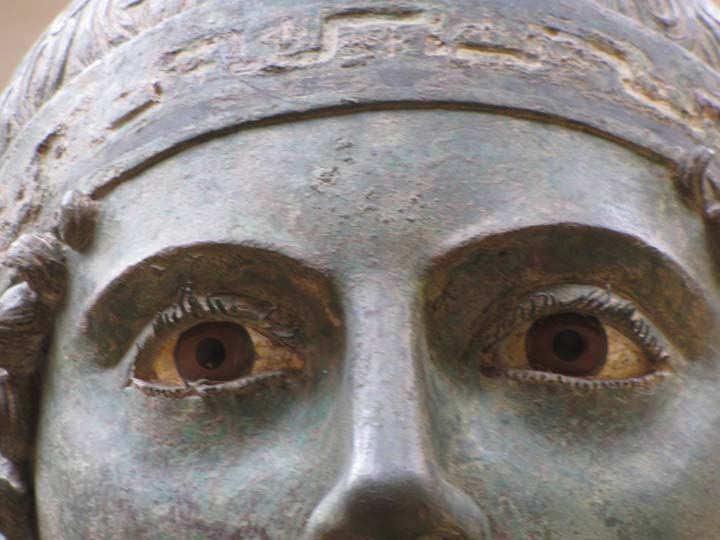
- Charioteer of Delphi, (3:38), Smarthistory

Most bronze statues from ancient times have long been destroyed, either having been melted down for their raw materials or were naturally corroded. Some freestanding bronze statues, however, including the charioteer, have been rediscovered in the 20th century. The Charioteer survived due to being buried under a rock-fall at Delphi, which likely destroyed the site in 373 B.C. On discovery the figure exhibited a blue appearance which correlates with Plutarch's description of the Spartan Monument from Delphi having an, "unusual blue and glossy patina, due to peculiarities of the air inside the sanctuary." After a century of indoor exposure, the Charioteer has turned a shade of green, although the lower torso still preserves a blue coloration. The statue remains mostly intact excluding its left forearm and certain details on the head, including the copper inlays on the lips, most of the silver eyelashes, and the headband. The statue is one of the few Greek bronze statues to be preserved with inlaid glass eyes. Greek bronzes were cast in sections and then assembled. When discovered, the statue was in three pieces—head and upper torso, lower torso, and right arm.

The figure is of a young man, as is demonstrated by his soft side-curls. Like modern jockeys, chariot racers were chosen for their lightness; however, they also needed to be tall, meaning they were frequently teenagers. It appears to represent a youth from a noble family of his time; aristocratic chariot racers selected their drivers from noble families for the Panhellenic Games. The Charioteer wears a customary long tunic (the xystis) reaching down to his ankles. A wide belt tightens the tunic high above the waist, while two other bands pass as suspenders over the shoulders, under the arms, and criss-cross on the back. This is the analavos, which keeps the garment from billowing in the wind during the race. The deep vertical pleats in the lower part of the tunic emphasize the Charioteer's solid posture, resembling also the fluting of an Ionic column. On the upper part of the body, however, the pleats are wavy, diagonal or curved. This contrast in the garment's representation is also followed by the body's contrapuntal posture, so that the statue does not show any rigidity, but looks perfectly mobile and lifelike. The entire statue appears as if it is animated, through a gradual shift to the right, starting from the solid stance of the feet, and progressing sequentially through the body, passing the hips, chest, and head, to end up at its gaze. The hands are spread out holding the reins, with long and thin fingers tightened around – together with the reins – a cylindrical object, the riding crop.

The Charioteer does not appear to be portrayed during the race, as his movement lacks intensity. Instead, it seems to be at its end, when he makes his victory lap around the hippodrome. The face and the body portray a great self-confidence and assuredness.

Unusually for this era, the Charioteer is clothed head to foot. Most athletes at this time would have competed, and been depicted, nude. This indicates that the young man would thus have been of a lower status than his master, Polyzalos. It has been speculated he may have been a household slave whom it was not appropriate to depict in the nude.

== Style ==
Stylistically, the Charioteer is classed as "Early Classical" or "Severe" (see Greek art). The statue is more naturalistic than the kouroi of the Archaic period, but the pose is rigid when compared with later works of the Classical period. A departure from the Archaic style is the slight inclination of his head to the right. The naturalistic rendering of his feet was greatly admired in ancient times. The introverted expression ignores the 'Archaic smile'.

== In popular culture ==
In approximately 1907, some ten years after the discovery of the Charioteer, Mariano Fortuny y Madrazo, a Spanish artist-designer based in Venice, created a finely pleated silk dress he named the Delphos gown, named after the statue, whose robes it closely resembled. These gowns are considered important pieces of early 20th century fashion. In 2003, A Delphos gown was the only fashion garment in the collection of the Museum of Modern Art, New York.

== Gallery ==
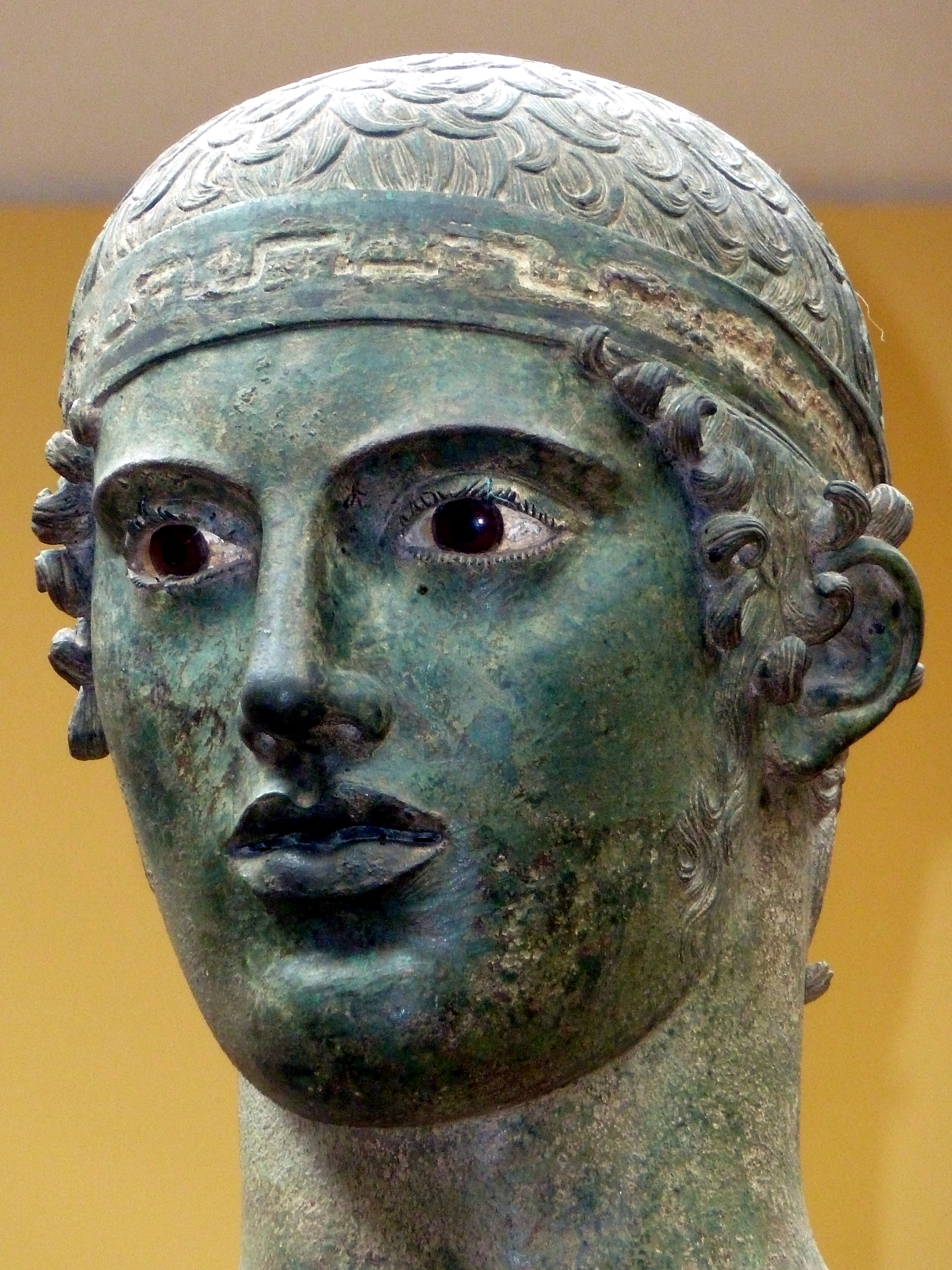

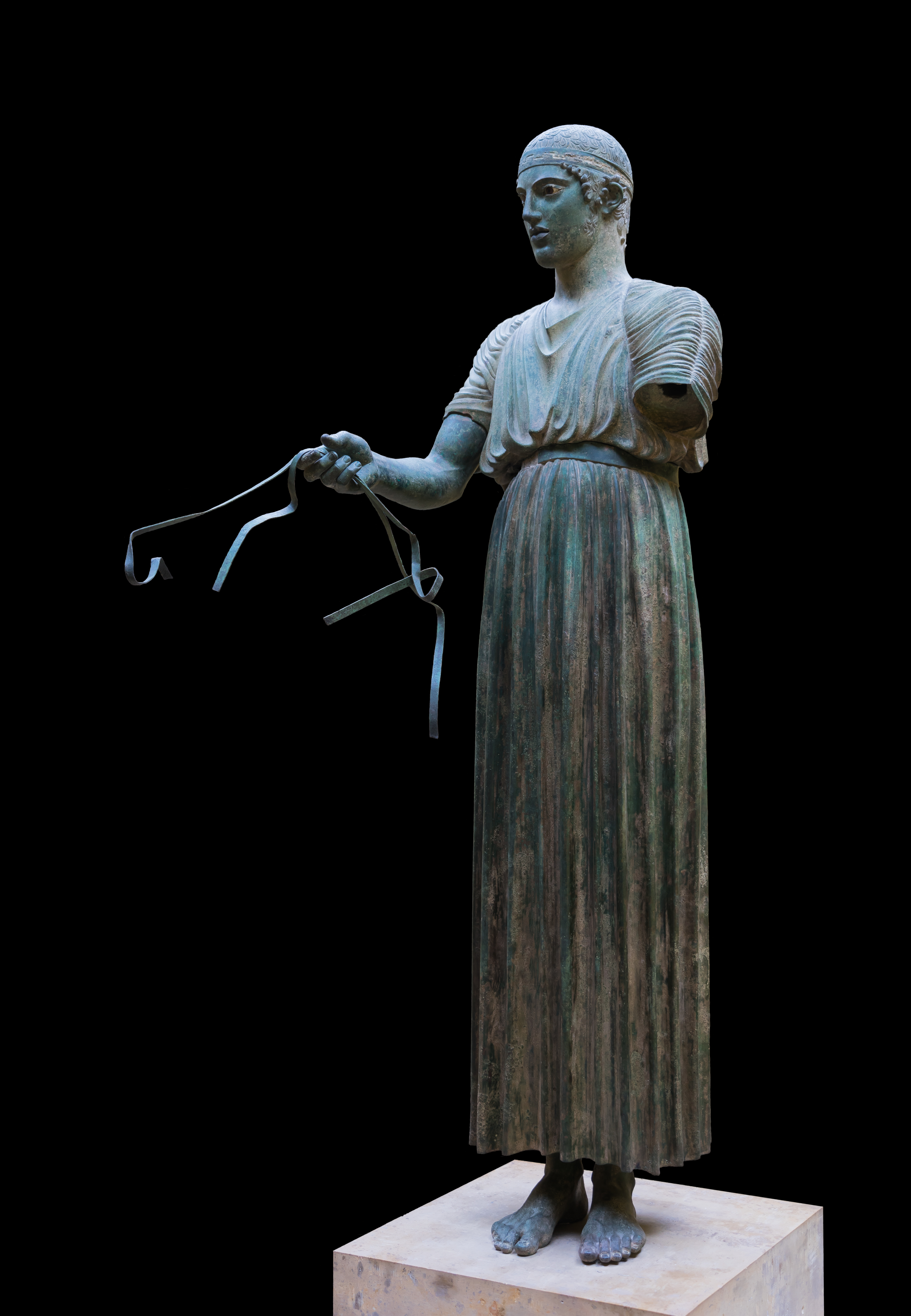

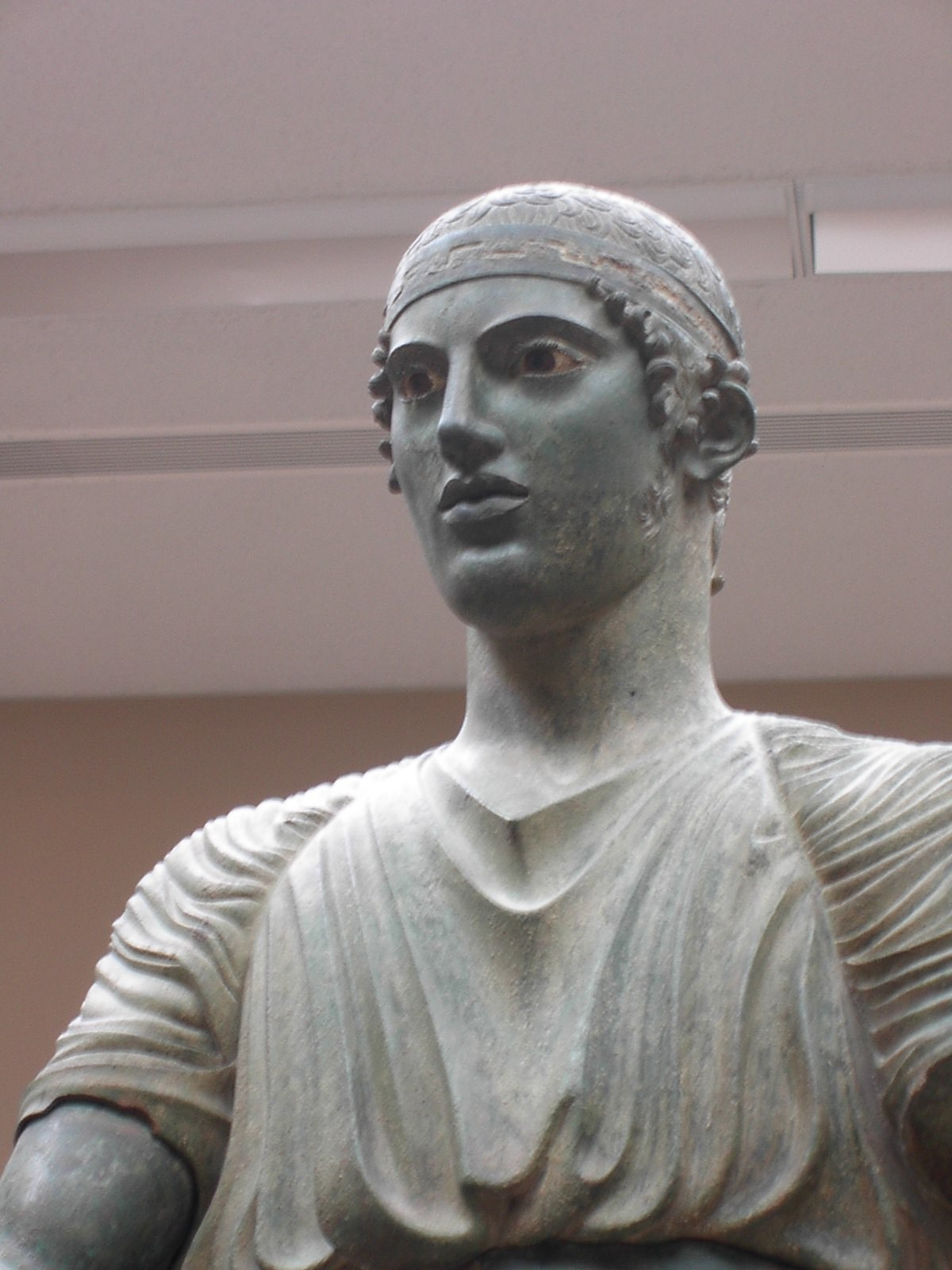
Detail of the statue's head, showing the inlaid eyes

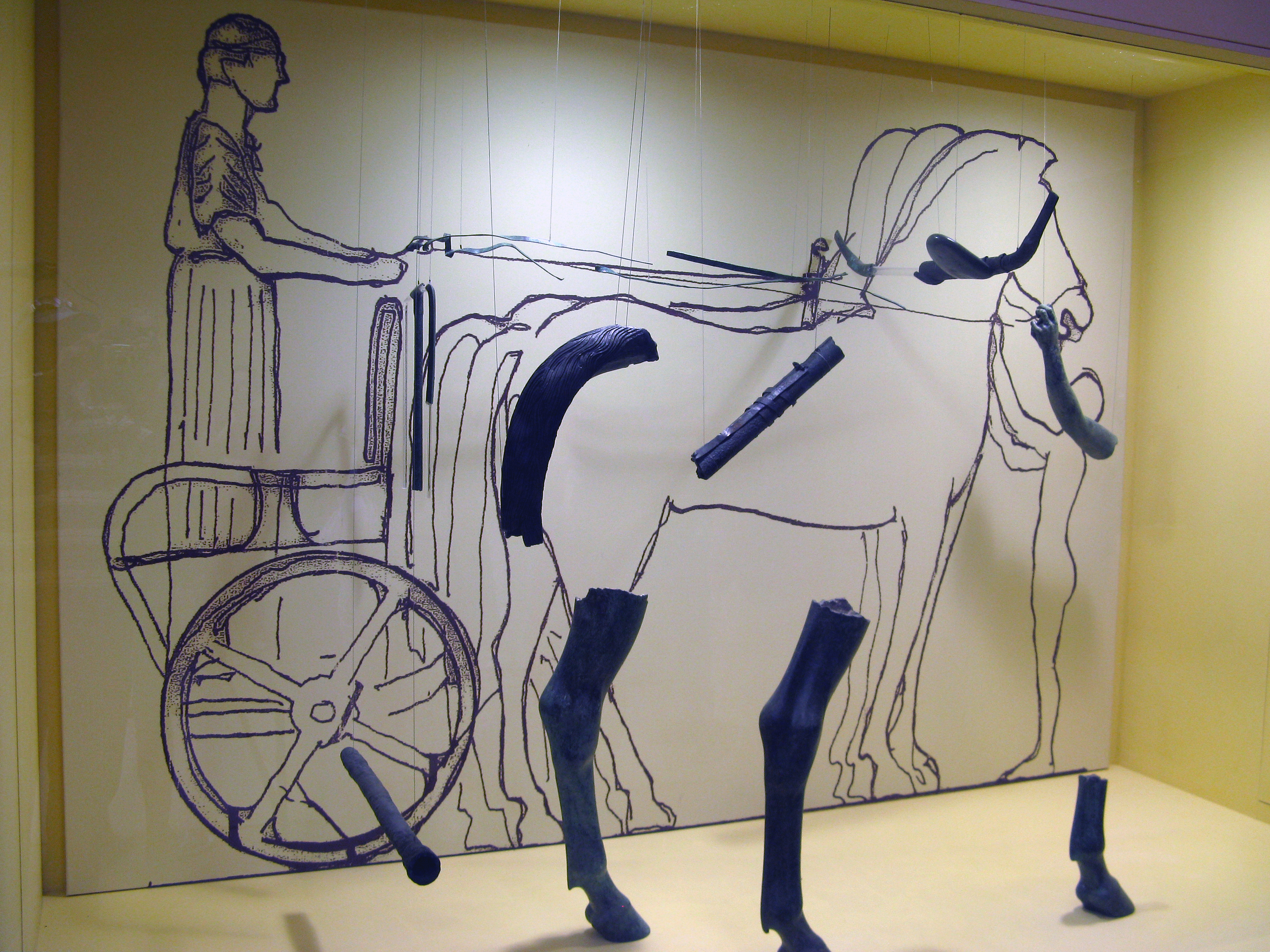
Fragments and drawing of Charioteer

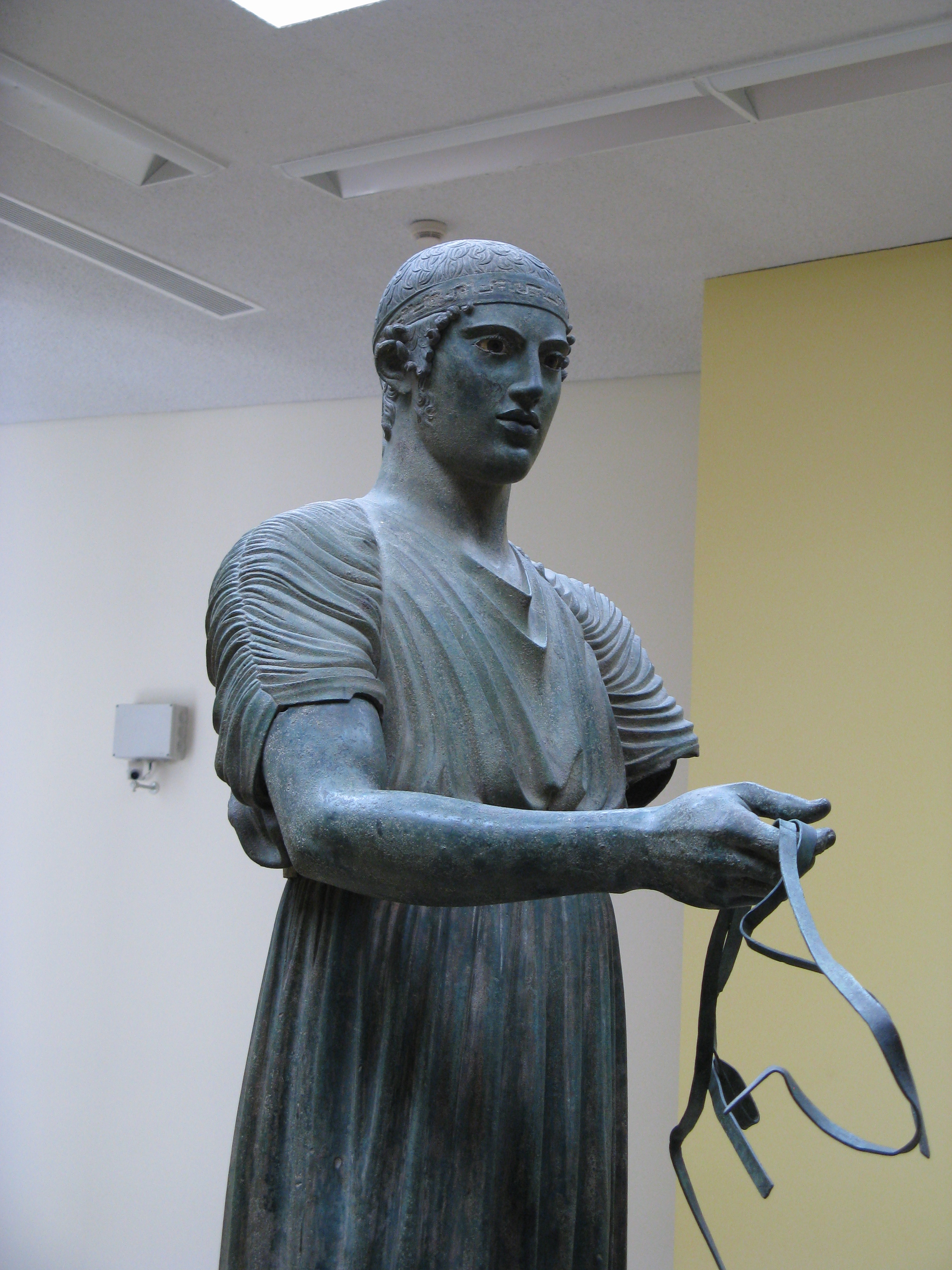
Detail of the statue's head and arm

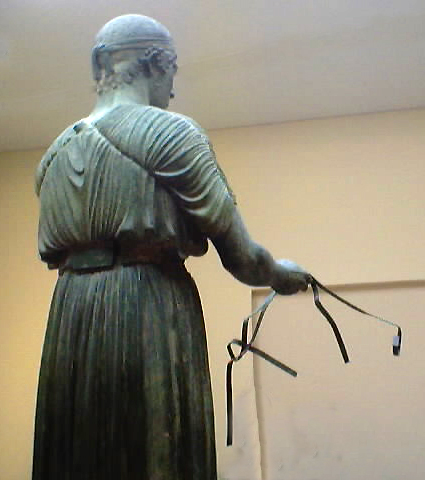
Back view of the Charioteer.

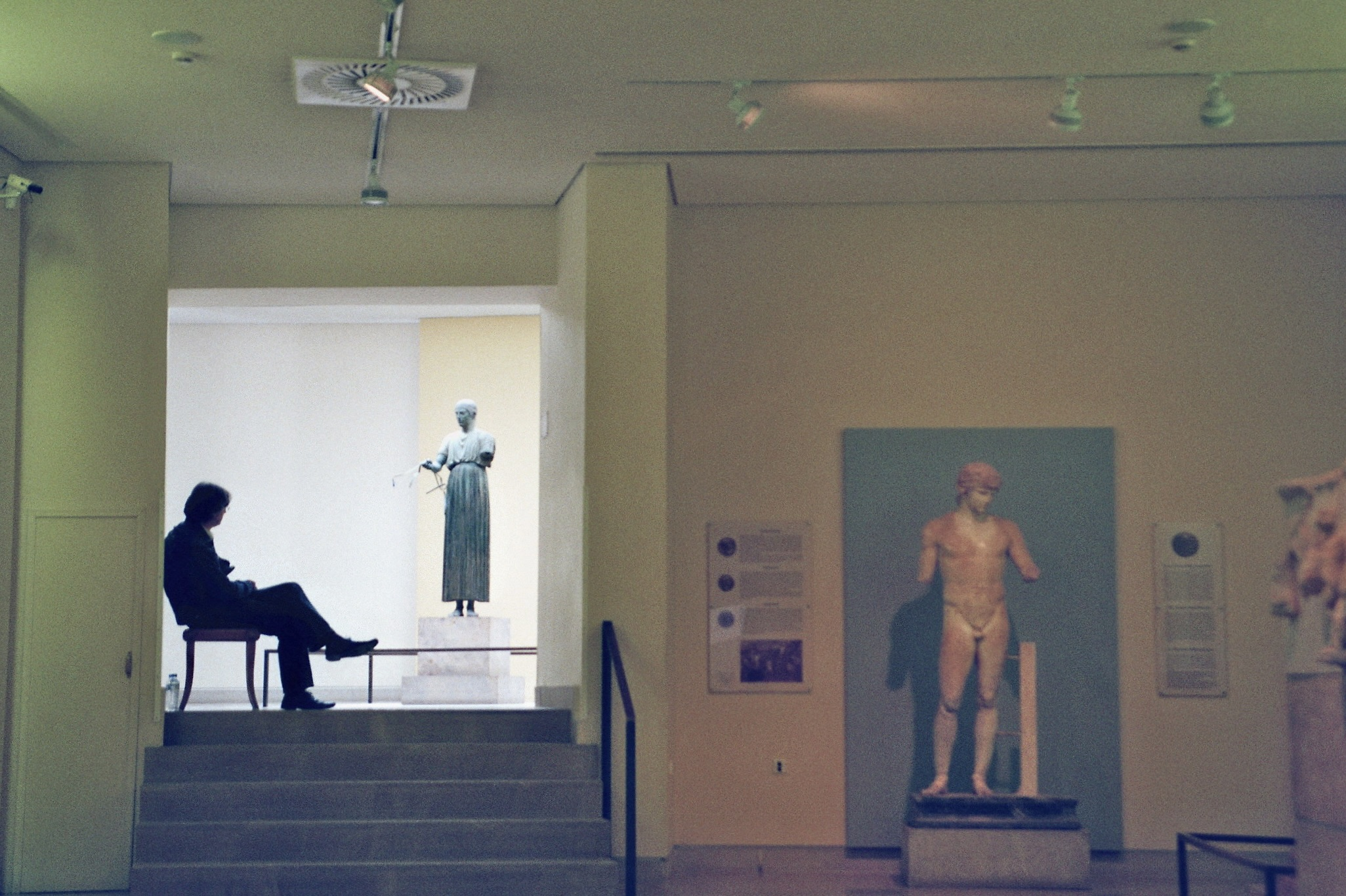
Position in the museum

== See also ==
- Artemision Bronze
- Riace bronzes
