= Theron of Acragas =

Greek Sicilian tyrant of Acragas (died 473 BC)

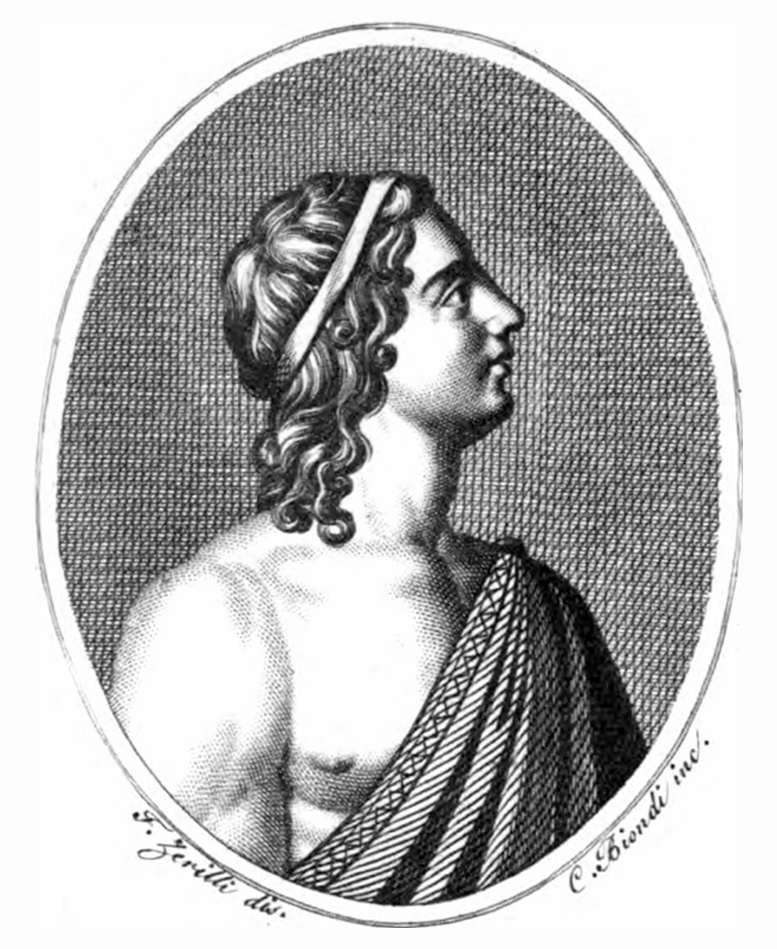
Portrait of Theron made in 1819

Theron (Greek: Θήρων, gen.: Θήρωνος; died 473 BC), son of Aenesidemus, was a Greek tyrant of the town of Acragas in Sicily in Magna Graecia from 488 BC. According to Polyaenus, he came to power by using public funds allocated for the hire of private contractors meant to assist with a temple building project, to instead hire a personal group of bodyguards. With this force at his disposal, he was able to seize control of the town's government. He soon became an ally of Gelon, who at that time controlled Gela, and from 485 BC, Syracuse. Gelon later became Theron's son-in-law.

Theron went to war with the city of Selinunte and the tyrant of Himera, Terillus. His kingdom covered a big part of Western Sicily, as a numismatic distribution study has brought afore. The latter, expelled from his city, therefore sought an alliance with Carthage through his son-in-law Anaxilas, tyrant of Rhegium. Theron occupied Himera but was then besieged in this city by a Carthaginian army, assisted by Terillus. In 480 BC, Theron, with the support of Gelo, won a great victory outside the walls of Himera against the Carthaginians and their allies. During the reign of Theron, Acragas along with Syracuse and Selinunte formed a kind of "triumvirate" which dominated Greek Sicily at the time. Theron died in 473 BC and was briefly succeeded by his son Thrasydaeus, before he was defeated by Gelo's brother and successor, Hiero I. After that defeat, Acragas came under the control of Syracuse.

According to Thierry Van Compernolle, the Acragantine Temple of Olympian Zeus was probably constructed during Theron's rule. In 1940, Heinrich Drerup argued that it was built as a monument to the victory over the Carthaginians in 480 BC; Mirko Vonderstein repudiates this theory, preferring to see Theron's desire to legitimise his rule as the reason for the temple's construction.

Pindar dedicated his second and third Olympian Odes to Theron, both for the same victory in the chariot race at the Olympic Games of 476 B.C. The poet Simonides of Ceos was also active at Theron's court.

== Bibliography ==
- Van Compernolle, Thierry, "Architecture et tyrannie", in L'antiqué classique, Vol. 58, pp. 44–70, 1989. doi:10.3406/antiq.1989.2258.
- Vonderstein, Mirko, "Das Olympieion von Akragas: Orientalische Bauformen an Einem Griechischen Siegestempel?", in Jahrbuch des Deutschen Archäologischen Instituts. Band 115, pp. 37–77, Berlin and New York, De Gruyter, 2001. ISBN 3110170965.

Preceded by: -	Tyrant of Acragras; 488 BC – 473 BC	Succeeded by: Thrasydaeus
