= Hiero I of Syracuse =

Tyrant of Syracuse from 478 to 467 BC

Hiero I (/ˈhaɪəroʊ/; also Hieron /ˈhaɪərɒn/; Ancient Greek: Ἱέρων) was the son of Deinomenes, the brother of Gelon and tyrant of Syracuse in Sicily, from 478 to 467 BC. In succeeding Gelon, he conspired against a third brother, Polyzalus.

== Life ==
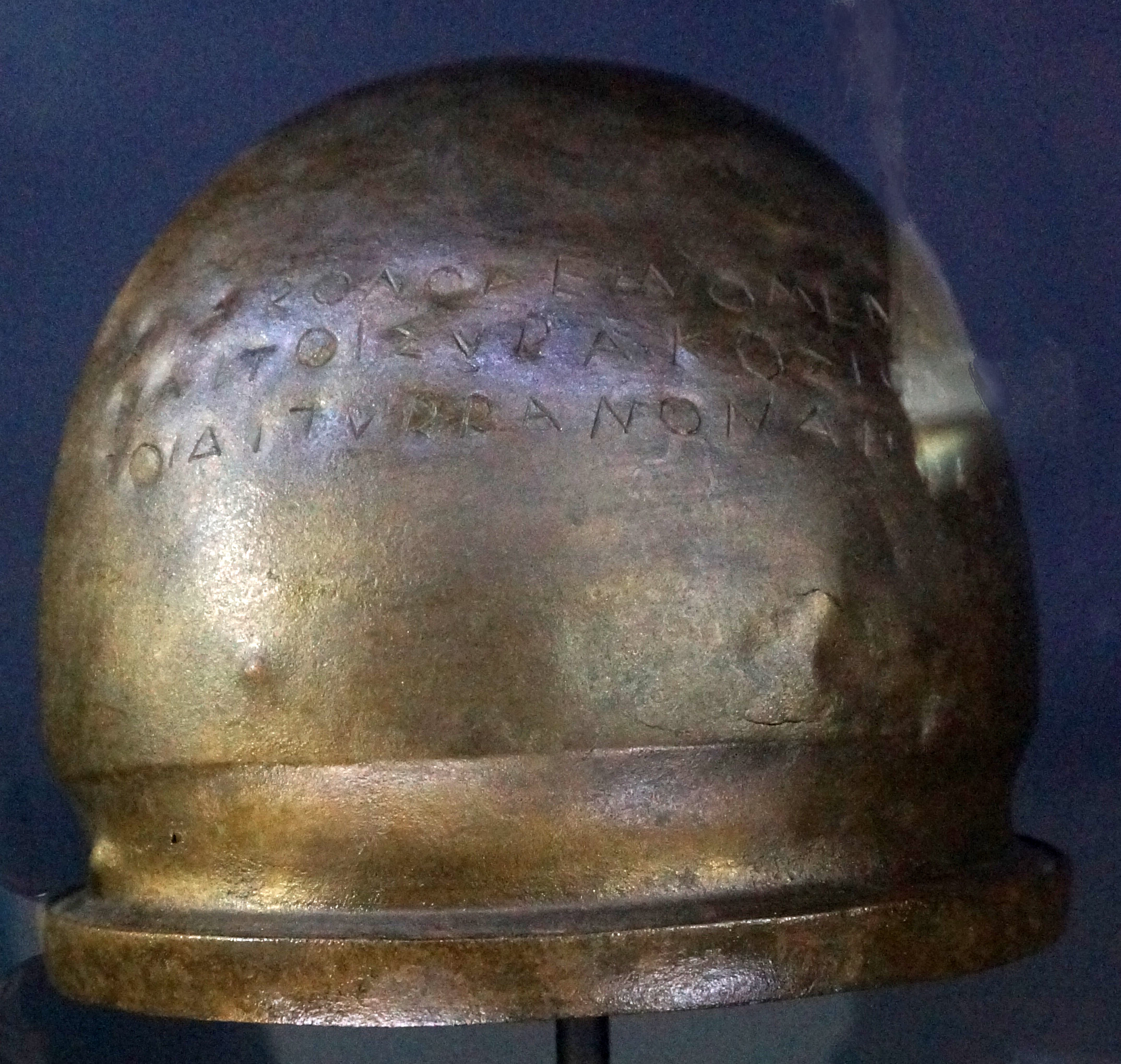
Helmet commemorating the Battle of Cumae now in the British Museum's collection

During his reign, he greatly increased the power of Syracuse. He removed the inhabitants of Naxos and Catania to Leontini, peopled Catania (which he renamed Aetna) with Dorians, concluded an alliance with Theron, the tyrant of Acragas (Agrigentum), and espoused the cause of the Locrians against Anaxilas, tyrant of Rhegium.

His most important military achievement was the defeat of the Etruscans at the Battle of Cumae (474 BC), by which he saved the Greeks of Campania from Etruscan domination. A bronze helmet (now in the British Museum), with an inscription commemorating the event, was dedicated at Olympia.

Hiero's reign was marked by the creation of what is believed to be the first secret police in Greek history, yet he was a liberal patron of literature and culture. The poets Simonides, Pindar, Bacchylides, Aeschylus, and Epicharmus were active at his court, as well the philosopher Xenophanes. He was an active participant in pan-hellenic athletic contests, winning several victories in the single horse race and also in the chariot race. He won the chariot race at Delphi in 470 BC (a victory celebrated in Pindar's first Pythian ode) and at Olympia in 468 BC (this, his greatest victory, was commemorated in Bacchylides' third victory ode). Other odes dedicated to him include Pindar's first Olympian Ode, his second and third Pythian odes, and Bacchylides' fourth and fifth victory odes.

He died at Catania/Aetna in 467 BC and was buried there, but his grave was later destroyed when the former inhabitants of Catania returned to the city. The tyranny at Syracuse lasted only a year or so after his death.

Preceded by: Gelo	Tyrant of Gela; 485 BC – 478 BC	Succeeded by: Polyzalus
Preceded by: Gelo	Tyrant of Syracuse; 478 BC – 467 BC	Succeeded by: Thrasybulus
