= Thrasybulus of Syracuse =

Tyrant of Syracuse from 466 to 465 BC

Thrasybulus (Greek: Θρασύβουλος) was a tyrant who ruled Syracuse, Magna Graecia, for eleven months during 466 and 465 BC. He was a member of the Deinomenid family and the brother of the previous tyrant Hiero, who seized power in Syracuse by convincing Gelon's son to give up his claim to the leadership of Syracuse. A few months later, members of the Deinomenid family overthrew him. However, the Deinomenid family was subsequently overthrown and a democracy was established in Syracuse. After Thrasybulus was toppled, a Syracusan cult to Zeus Eleutherios was instituted in celebration, the first in Sicily, and a large statue and games were created in the god's honour.

== Notes ==
Preceded by: Hieron I	Tyrant of Syracuse; 466 BC– 465 BC	Succeeded by: democracy position next held by Dionysius I in 405 BC
