= Greek baths =

Public bathing place in ancient Greece

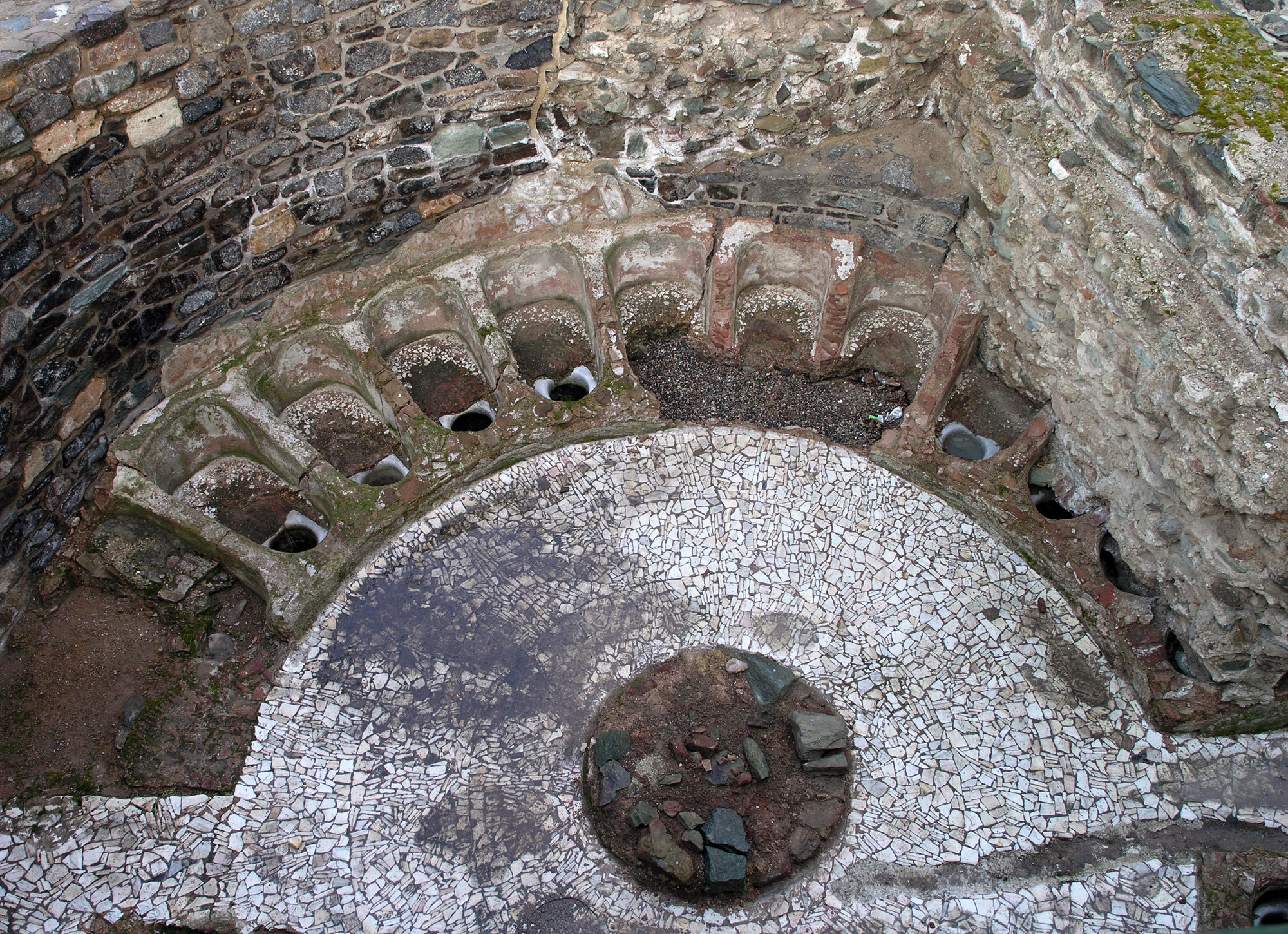
Greek baths of Thessaloniki, 3rd cent. BC

Greek baths were bath complexes suitable for bathing and cleaning in ancient Greece, similar in concept to that of the Roman baths. Greek baths are a feature of some Hellenized countries. These baths have been found in Greece, Egypt, Italy, and there is even one located in Marseille, France. Some of the first baths have been dated back to the 5th century BC. The public baths had a gradual development into the flourishing, culturally-significant structures of the Hellenistic age. The multiple locations of the baths throughout the Mediterranean offer different, culturally-unique developments.

Greek baths did not have to follow the same design and construction rules as temples or other civic buildings in Greece and, thus, the baths were very innovative. Greek baths were always the same in their functions, but not the same in their designs. Despite the variability dependent on each location and population, there are certain features that have come to define the Greek bath. Some of the prominent elements include tholoi, hip baths and other types of baths and pools, and heating and water systems.

The importance of Greek baths grew overtime and became an important part to the cultures they had involvement with. In many of these cities there was a transition from individual baths to more communal baths and other spaces. Even in places that didn't embrace the communal pools, there was still a drastic development in the technology of bath houses and the importance of bathing for relaxation as well as cleanliness.

== History ==
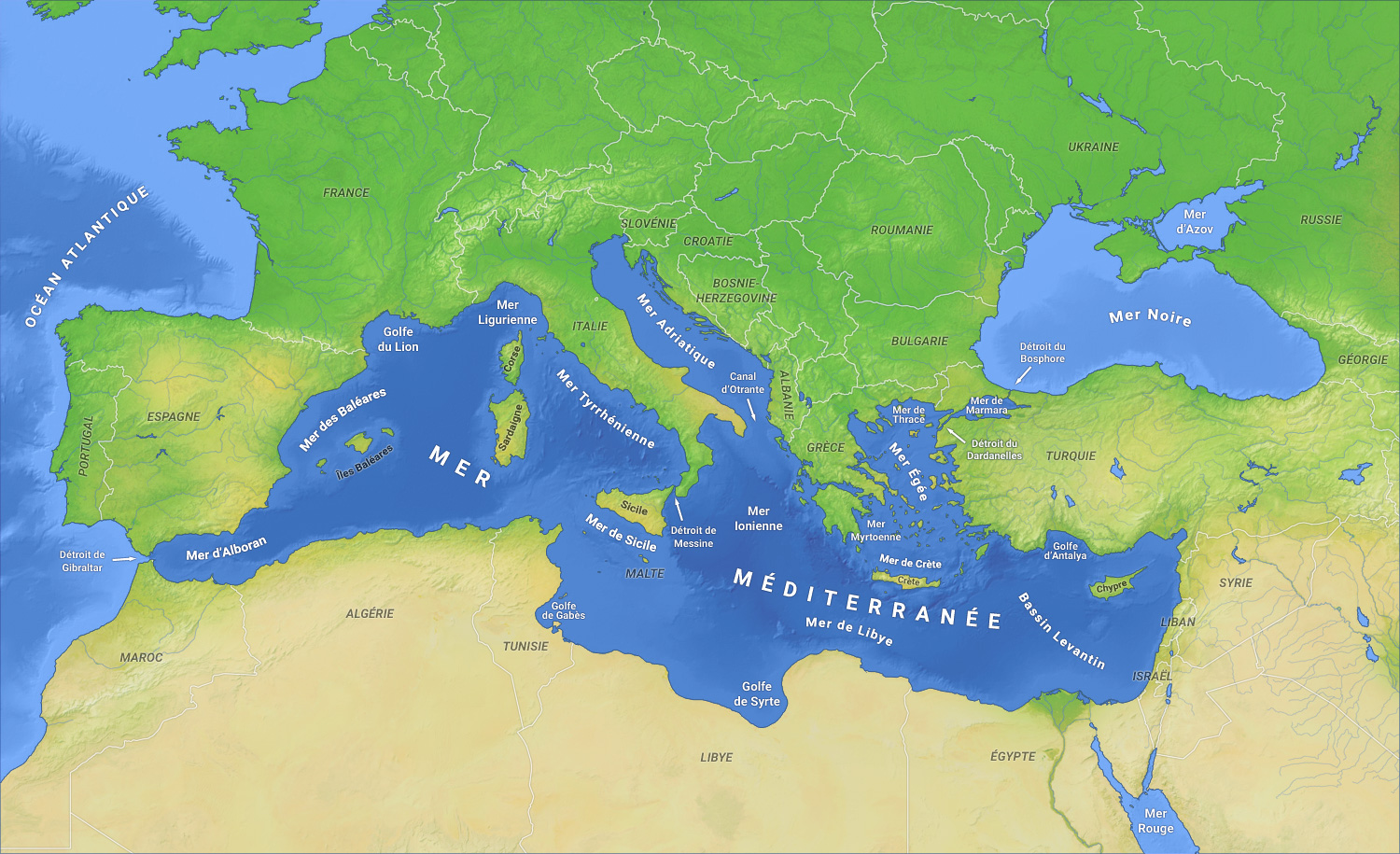
Map of the Mediterranean. Greek baths have been found in several countries throughout this area

The earliest Greek baths date back to the first half of the 5th century BC. While it was not the only Greek city with public baths, some of the first archaeological evidence comes from the Dipylon Baths in Athens. Athens was a place of great innovation of the public baths. The Greek's original form of bathing consisted of nothing more than a quick plunge into icy water until the people of Laconia came upon the idea of a hot-air bath. The hot-air bath later came to be known as a laconia bath. The people of Laconia were from the Sparta area. With this bath came the idea of a spa along with public bathing.

Public baths were not accepted immediately due to beliefs held by Greek society. The baths were an amenity that provided comfort for its users, contrasting the discipline and masculine virtues expected by Greek men. This slow acceptance resulted in a small number of public baths being built and used during the 5th and 4th centuries BC. During a time of urban refinement in the Hellenistic period, the baths were at the height of their development. Individual comfort and well-being became more important to Greek society and, as a result, the number of baths increased and held a place of importance to Greek life.

== Laconia bath ==
The water for the laconia bath was heated one of two different ways. The first being by direct coal burning fires and the other being the hot rock method, which consists of heating up rocks in another room and bringing them inside the bath.

== Locations ==
Greek baths can be found throughout the Mediterranean. In Greece they can be found in Olympia, Corinth, Athens, Delos, Epidauros, Messene, Nemea and several other sites. Before the Hellenistic period, the majority of public baths were outside of the city’s walls. As baths became more accepted, their locations shifted from the outskirts to the inner parts of the city. Specifically, they would be built in very important and accessible areas. They can also be found in other countries: Alexandria, Egypt and Gela, Italy for example.

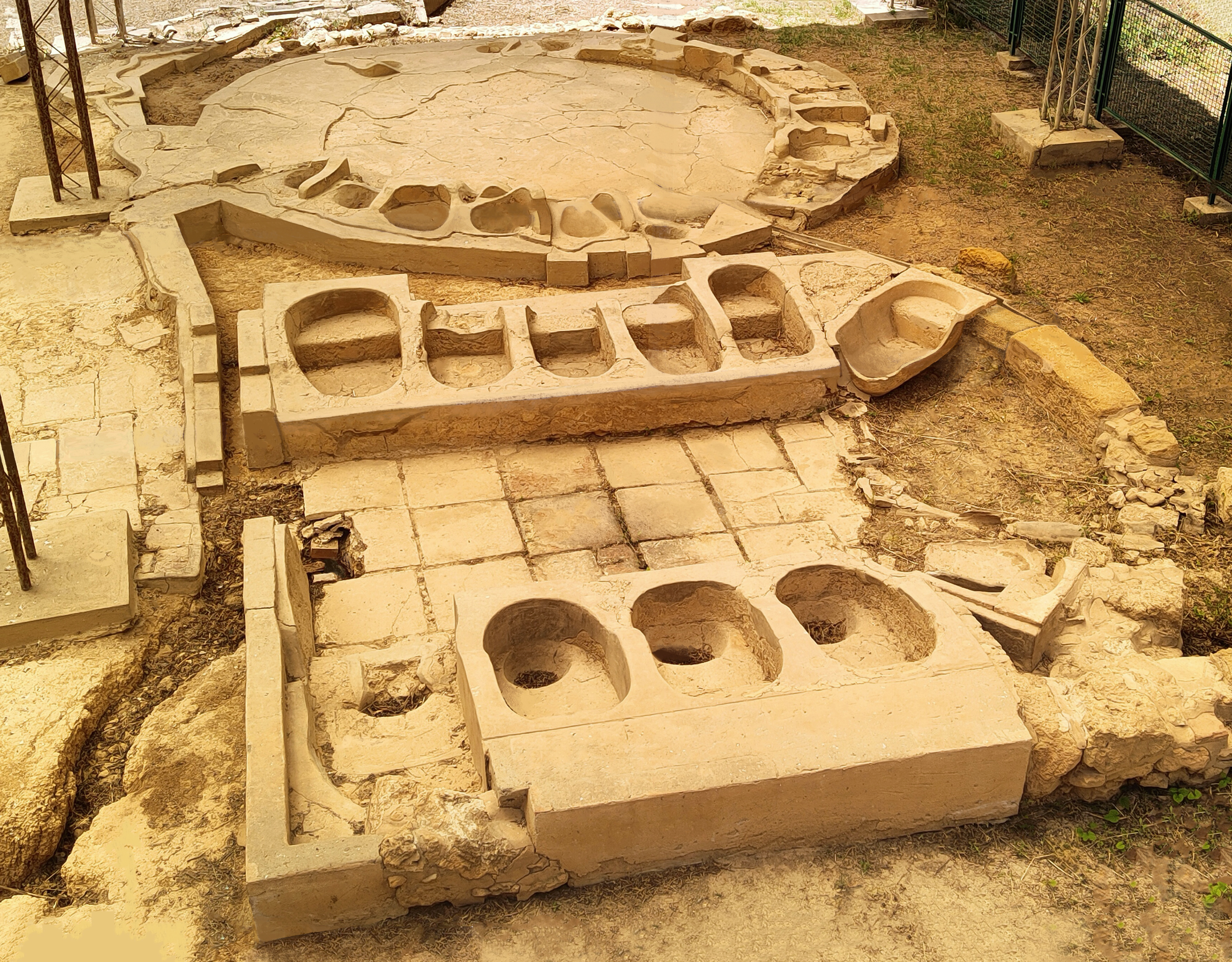
Greek baths of Gela, Italy, are the earliest known in Sicily

=== Western Greek baths ===
Greek baths reached parts of Italy and Greek Sicily during the 4th century BC. The baths in this region are clearly Greek, as they were brought over by new Greek inhabitants. The Greek baths of Gela, the earliest known in Sicily, resembled the baths at Olympia where the hip baths were in a rectangular shaped room. A second bathing room, installed in a later renovation, followed the tholos design which was then used exclusively in all subsequent Sicilian baths. The Sicilian Greek baths were innovative in their own ways, specifically because they featured some of the earliest hypocaust systems known to be in Greek bath houses. The North Baths of Morgantina and the baths in Syracuse provide a thorough picture of the height of Greek bath design and technology. The North Baths show a complex system of rooms including reception, waiting, and changing rooms; relaxation and bathing rooms; and rooms for the furnace, furnace service, and water reservoir. Also first appearing in these locations was the separation of the building into two different zone: one for hygienic bathing and the other for relaxing and socializing (often in an immersion pool).

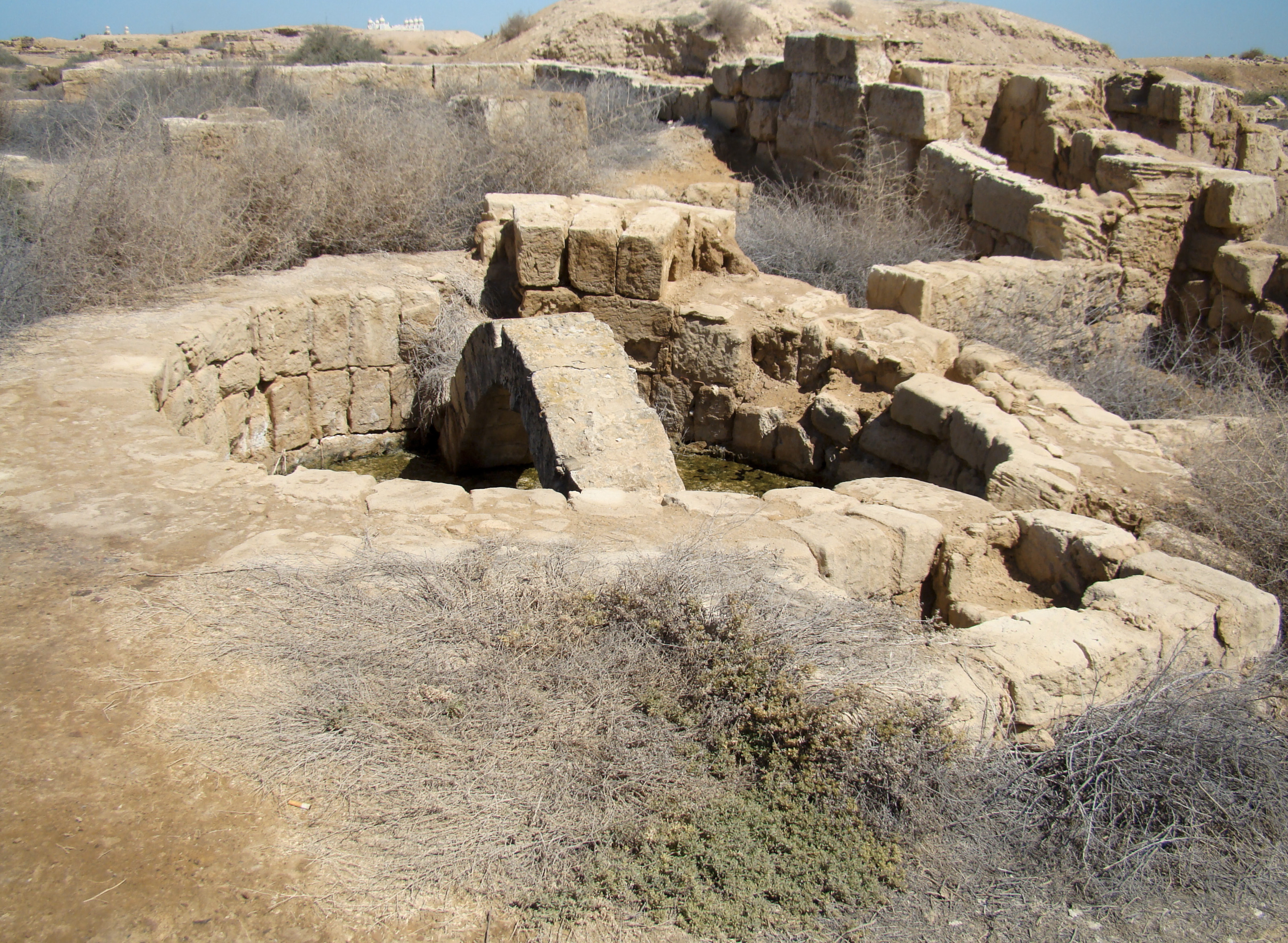
Greek baths of Abu Mena, one of the various bathing sites in Egypt

=== Egyptian Greek baths ===
The Greek baths made their way to Egypt and were built in strong numbers. Egyptian Greek baths featured two tholoi separated by a central corridor, which is a key element of these baths. The two tholoi are thought to have been used to separate men and women (further supported by the fact that the tholoi did not have direct access to each other). Or they might have been used simply to have more available bathing space. In Egypt, people bathed separately from each other, rather than in the immersion pools popular in Western Greece. For a long time, scholars believed the Egyptian Greek baths used braziers to heat their water and had no other heating system. However, a new bath called Taposiris Magna was uncovered and revealed a developed, distinctly Egyptian heating system, including heated walls.

== Floor plan and features ==
=== Types of baths ===
Greek baths can be separated into three types: the gymnasium bath, the domestic bath, and the public bath. The baths at the gym were hardly even baths, rather there were basins of water where the men could stand at and clean themselves. In some cases there would be a piscina, a pool or pond that could be used for bathing and sometimes swimming. Gym baths did not use heated water. Domestic baths, located in private homes, were a single room with only a bath tub and some times a wash basin. Public baths are typically synonymous with Greek baths.

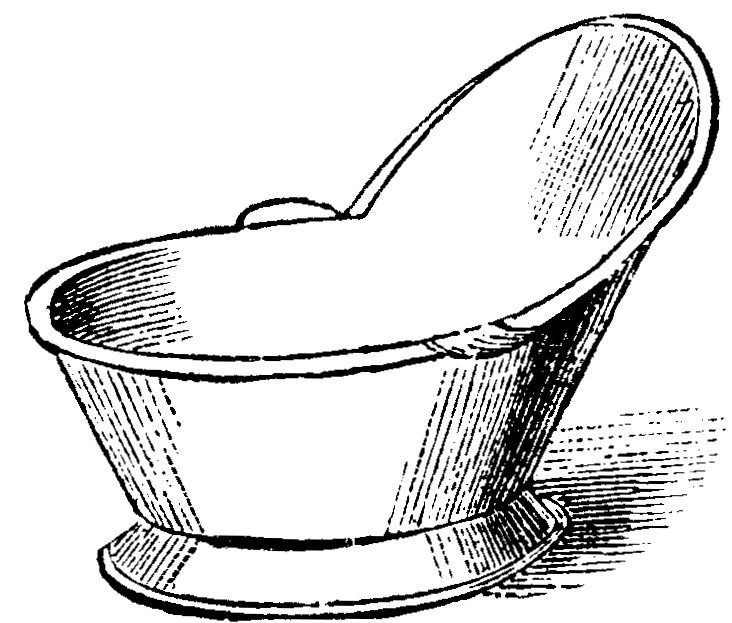
A hip bath, also known as a sitz bath

=== Key plans and features ===
As a whole, Greek baths were not homogenous, especially as they spread to different regions and societal values and construction methods shifted during the Hellenistic age. Different cities altered the layouts depending on the needs of the local population. There were, however, certain features that pervaded most bathing structures. The public baths are made up of one or more rooms that are typically circular. This circular floor plan is called a tholos. The key feature in early Greek baths was the hip baths centered in the tholos. While the bathing space was public, the hip baths were used individually. The construction of the hip baths varied but most were terracotta or stone. The visitor would be seated in their bath while an attendant poured water over them. This style of bathing is reminiscent of showers, where there is a flow of water over their bodies. Due to the design of the hip baths, bathers could not fully submerge their bodies under water.

Aside from the baths themselves, there were braziers to heat the room during the winter and a furnace to heat the water. There was a specific service area for the furnace. In another room, visitors could wait for their turn or change out of their clothes. Greek baths had everything needed to offer a simple place for cleaning and the maintenance of the warm and wet spaces. Occasionally public baths would feature a piscina, although they were typically only deep enough for wading, not swimming. Even more rarely found in public baths are wash basins, which were common in gymnasium baths.

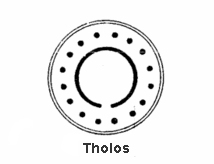
Example of tholos

The style of the baths evolved over time including larger or additional tholoi, decorated floors, and other forms of bathing aimed more at relaxation. There are several structures, such as the baths at Olympia, that show these changes and the trend of renovation. Using the Greek Baths in ancient Olympia as an example, a Greek bathhouse started off as nothing more than a single rectangular structure 20 meters long and four meters wide. A well was situated at one end of the room where the athletes could draw water. The bath was renovated upon several occasions. The first being around the 5th century BC saw a smaller room added where small built tubs were put along the north and east side and an adjacent swimming pool. The second around the end of the 4th century BC another room was added on the west side with three of the walls being lined with additional tubs and hot water. The third renovation took place around the 1st century BC, which saw an addition of a large apsidal room to the south along with a hypocaust system.

== Water management ==
While Greek baths grew in cultural significance, they were generally less complex than their Roman counterparts. The water management of both, however, can be put into four groups: water provisioning, water use, water disposal, and modes of operation.

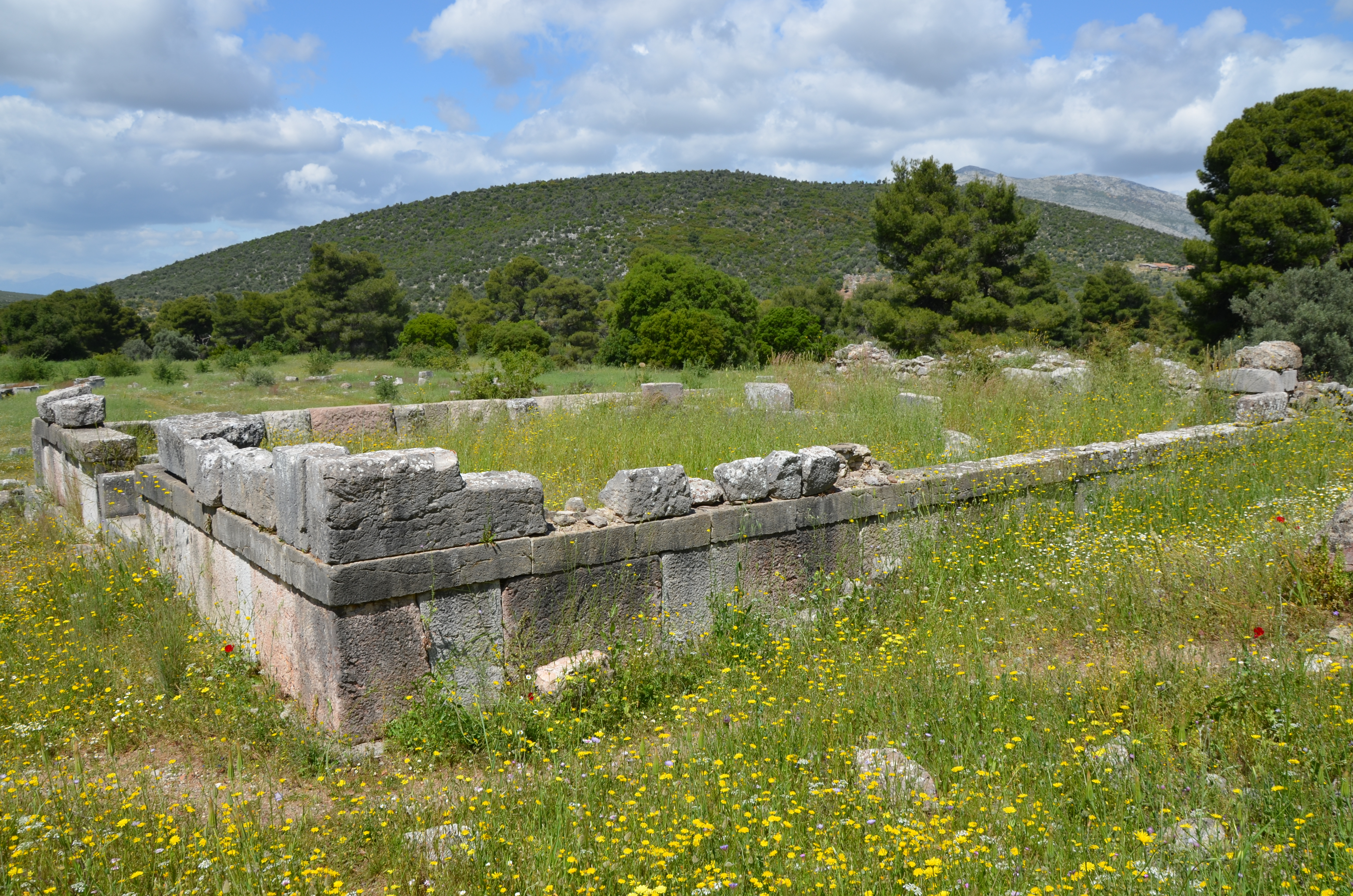
Example: ruins of a Hellenistic cistern in Epidaurus, Greece

=== Water provisioning ===
The Greeks utilized four different kinds of water provisioning: gathering and keeping rain water in cisterns, bringing water from the ground (wells), tapping sources of flowing water nearby such as rivers and springs, and bringing water from more far-off sources. Of these, the Greeks would use the method most suitable to the local area. Take the baths at Nemea and Athens, for example. In Nemea, an aqueduct brought spring water from the hills and was held in a reservoir that was built next to the bath house. At the Dipylon Baths in Athens the water was brought from a nearby well. There were also aqueducts in Athens, but, unlike Nemea, no evidence supports that they supplied the bath house with water.

=== Water use and heating ===
The way water was used in the baths depended on the way it was provisioned as well as the types of baths and heating systems. Public baths required a degree of manual movement of the water. The attendants helped the visitors bathe but they also would have needed to mix the hot water with cold water beforehand so that it would be a suitably warm temperature, rather than boiling hot. The continuous development of heating systems saw the rise of luxury bathing. The heating systems were of course used to heat the water but also for other types of heated bathing, such as sweat rooms, heated pools, and even heated water tanks.

=== Water disposal and operations ===
The hip baths and other bath tubs generally did not have run-off devices. As a result, the used water from the tubs would have been bailed out by attendants and dumped onto the floor of the room. A drainage system in the floor was necessary to remove the dumped water and prevent the room from flooding. The floor also needed to be angled properly so the water would actually run to the drains. It is likely there was some type of waterproof pavement as well. Furthermore, the drains took the waste-water out of the bath house and dumped it outside, likely into a body of water like a canal. Unlike what was common in Roman baths, the Greeks did not often reuse the waste-water. However, there are some instances where the waste-water would be moved to foot or toilet basins. The Greek aqueducts had less output than those of the Romans, so having that water supply Greek baths was not common. Therefore, Greek baths did not have running water like the Romans. More likely is a system of changing out the water daily or regularly refilling the basins.

== Social life and culture ==
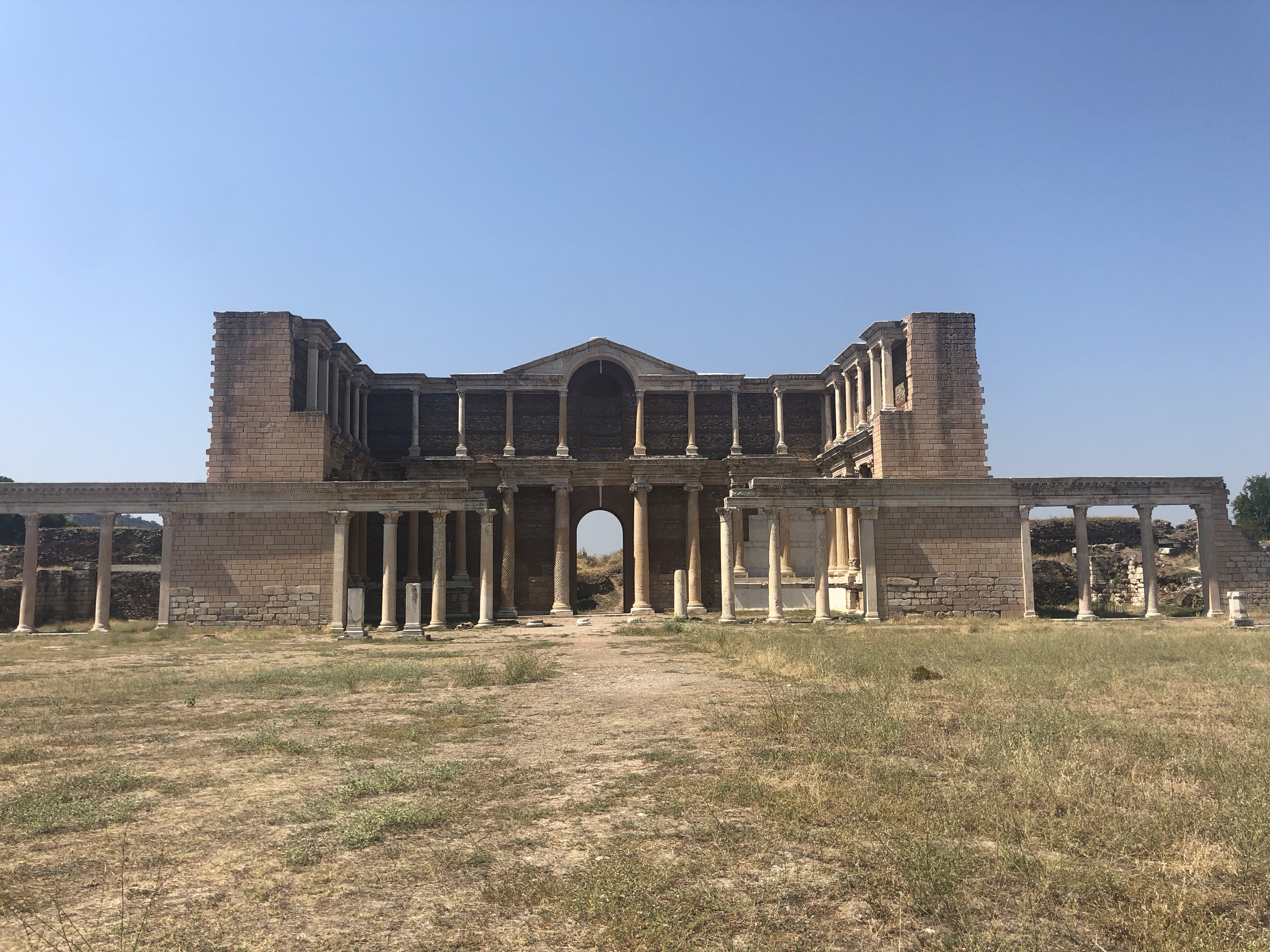
Greek gymnasium in Sardes, Türkiye

The culture surrounding Greek baths, and public bathing in general, is not extremely well known or studied. The use of baths for athletes at the gymnasium is the most informed area of Greek bathing culture. However, despite the situational and procedural context of every-day bathing is not often being written down from the past, the evidence from archaeological sites and art can offer information.

By the 2nd century BC, public baths were a very important part of Greek culture (and Egyptian and South Italian culture), as can be seen from the developments in the design of the baths and their locations. The Egyptians added more tholos to fit the growing number of visitors. In many Greek cities, bathing came to include both individual tubs and community immersion pools and sweat baths (also communal). While the sense of community grew in public baths, it was not accepted everywhere. For example, Egypt never adopted the group baths. The baths at Gortys did not have communal pools, as it did not suit their local customs. Gortys did develop individual immersion baths, which still brought a shift from hygienic bathing to bathing for relaxation purposes.

== See also ==
- Greek baths of Gela
