= Omphace =

Omphace or Omphake (Ancient Greek: Ὀμφάκη) was an ancient Sicanian town in the Greek territory of Gela, and is one of very few cities we know from literary sources to have been in this territory.

Various scholars have identified modern Butera as ancient Omphace. If it was indeed Butera, the site's location is a formidable one: located on a high mountain on the plain of Gela, ideal for the defense of the fertile plain. Other scholars have identified it as Monte Bubbonia. The name of the town presumably comes from the ancient Greek word "ómphax", which means "wild, bitter grape".

There exists a story from the ancient geographer Pausanias in which Antiphemus from Gela colonized the city of Omphace and carried off a statue made by the mythological Daedalus.

In a story from the historian Philistus, the city was occupied by mercenaries from Syracuse, the former garrison of Gela, who after the fall of the Deinomenids retreated to Omphace to continue waging a campaign against Gela.

Archaeologically, the city shows ancient Greek influence from the 7th century BCE. There is some evidence that in the 4th century BCE the city benefited from the reconstruction program of Timoleon in Sicily.

There was a sanctuary there, and a cult for a deity called "Polystephanos Thea", which was likely a nymph of a character similar to the goddess Artemis.
