= Greek Baths in ancient Olympia =

Part of the archaeological site of Olympia, Greece

UNESCO World Heritage Site
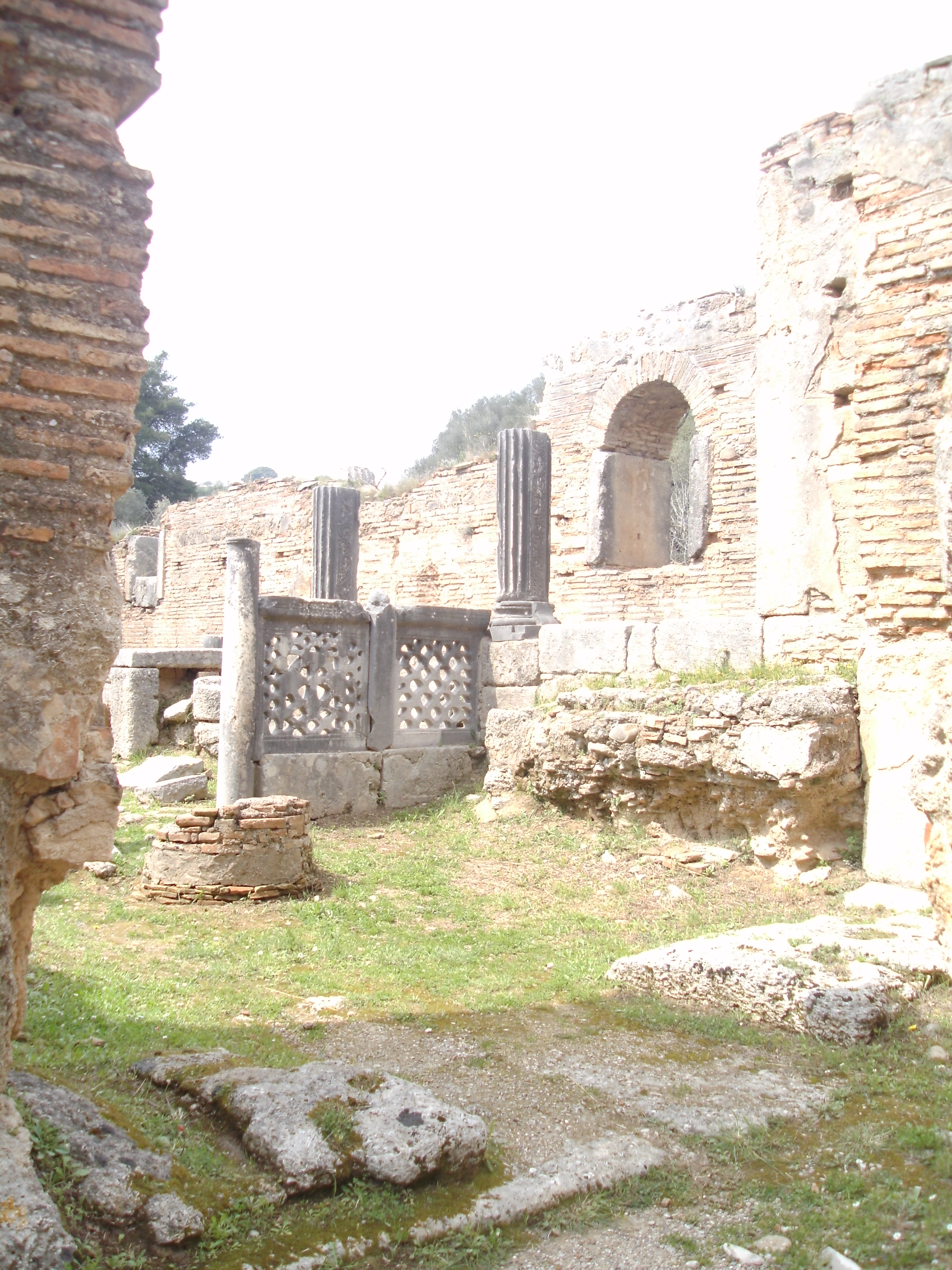
- Ελληνικά: Ελληνικά λουτρά Ολυμπίας«Ελληνικά λουτρά της Αρχαίας Ολυμπίας» credit: Anna Tsiaki license

- Location within Greece
- Location: Greece
- Part of: Archaeological Site of Olympia
- Criteria: Cultural i, ii, iii, iv, vi
- Reference: 517
- Inscription: 1989 (13th Session)
- Buffer zone: 1,458.18 ha (3,603.2 acres)
- Coordinates: 37.638°N 21.628°E

The Greek Baths in ancient Olympia are the earliest baths in the sanctuary and they are situated on the west side, outside the sacred enclosure of the Altis, near the bank of the river Kladeos. They were constructed during the 5th century B.C. and developed throughout their use. In the 2nd century A.D. they were used as the foundation for the construction of the Kladeos Baths. They are called Greek Baths in order to distinguish them from the baths of the Roman period at the same area.

The initial simple building with the well was gradually transformed into a luxurious space with more complex architecture and ample decorations and mosaics. In the Roman period, the water supply and drainage systems were perfected. There were both hot and cold baths, as was common in training areas and sport competition venues.

The Greek baths were built to service the needs of the athletes, since they used them to wash after training or after the Ancient Olympic Games. In those days, athletes would rub their body with oil and then throw dust on it during training, in order to improve their performance. This was a time-consuming process, but it was necessary and followed a certain ritual. The cleaning of their body after training sessions and sport competitions was very important for the athletes. First, they used the strigil to scrape the oils and dust off their bodies. Then, they were massaged to soothe the nervous system. The last part was the ‘cleansing’ of the body and soul with water.

== See also ==
- Greek baths of Gela
