= Sanctuary of San Rocco, Butera =

Roman Catholic parish church in Caltanisetta, Sicily, Italy

Coordinates: 37.18583°N 14.18827°E

The Santuario di San Rocco is a Roman Catholic parish church on Via San Rocco in the town of Butera, province of Caltanisetta, region of Sicily, Italy.

A smaller church was present by the 16th century, likely under the patronage of the Branciforti family. Enlarged over the centuries by the 18th century, it gained its present layout and much of the decoration. In 1907, large canvases depicting the Life of St Roch were painted by Domenico Provenzali. In the 1970s, the interior was embellished with new lamps and the marble floors repaved. In 1998, the main portal was replaced with one with wooden bas-reliefs both on the interior and exterior, the reliefs engraved by the sculptor Rio Puci.
