= Antiphemus =

- Αντίϕημος
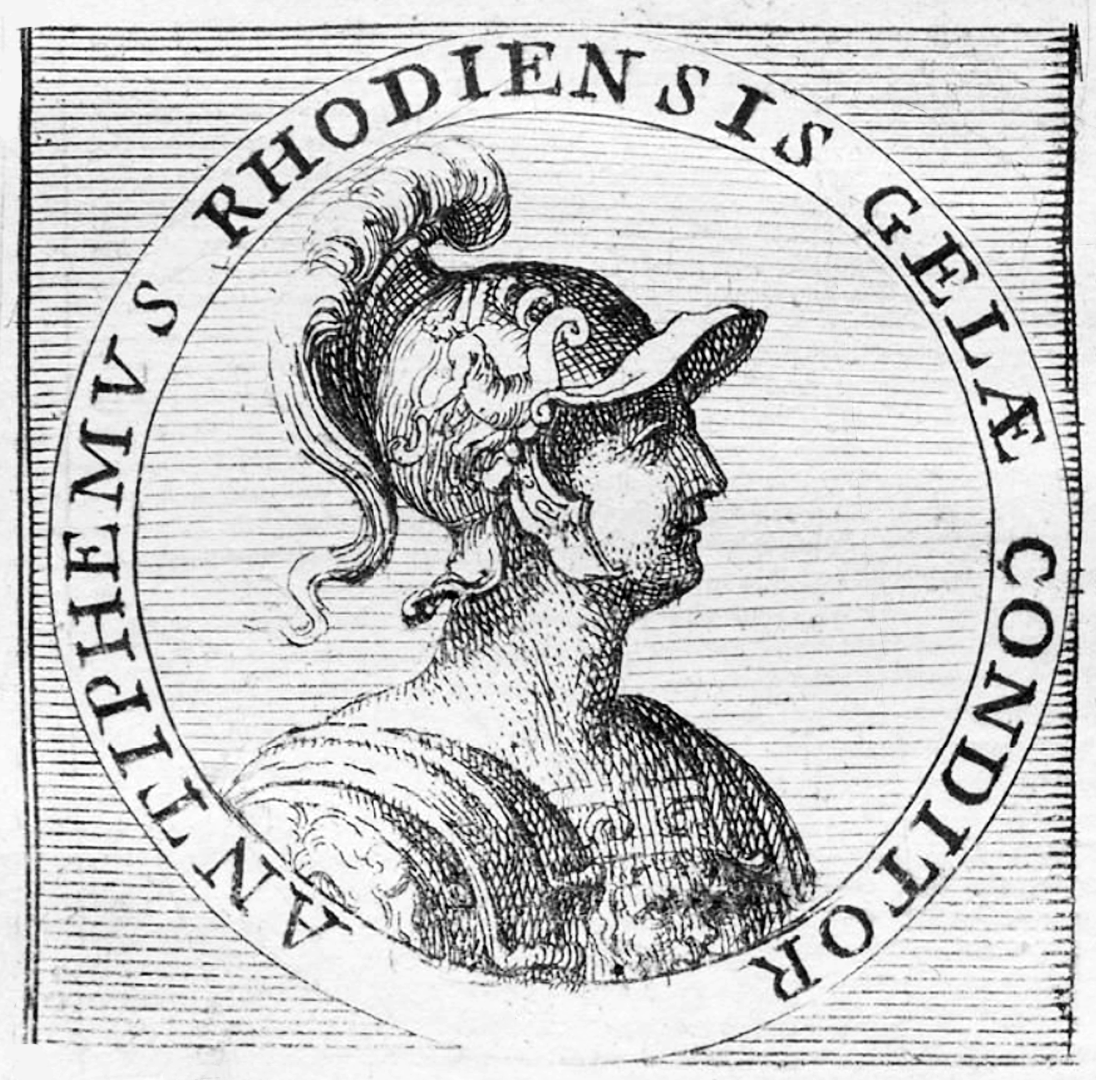
- Illustration from Delle memorie istoriche dell'antica città di Gela nella Sicilia, 1753
- Born: c. 7th century BCE; Rhodes
- Burial place: Gela
- Occupation: Oikistes of Gela
- Father: Craton
- Relatives: ? Lacius (brother)

Antiphemus (Ancient Greek: Ἀντίφημος) was a man from ancient Greece from Rhodes who was the founder of Gela, around 690 BCE. The colony was composed of Rhodians and Cretans, the latter led by Entimus the Cretan, the former chiefly from Lindus, and to this town Antiphemus himself belonged.

From the Etymologicum Magnum and Aristaenetus in Stephanus of Byzantium it appears the tale ran that Antiphemus and his brother Lacius, the founder of Phaselis, were, when at Delphi, suddenly bid to go forth, one eastward, one westward; and from his laughing at the unexpected response, the city took its name. From Pausanias we hear of his taking the Sicanian town of Omphace as an oikistes, and carrying off from it a statue made by the legendary Daedalus.

The 19th century scholar Karl Otfried Müller considered Antiphemus a mythical person.
