= San Francesco, Butera =

Church in Butera, Italy

Coordinates: 37.18427°N 14.18675°E

San Francesco D'Assisi is a Roman Catholic church and former minorite convent in the town of Butera, the province of Caltanissetta, the region of Sicily, Italy.

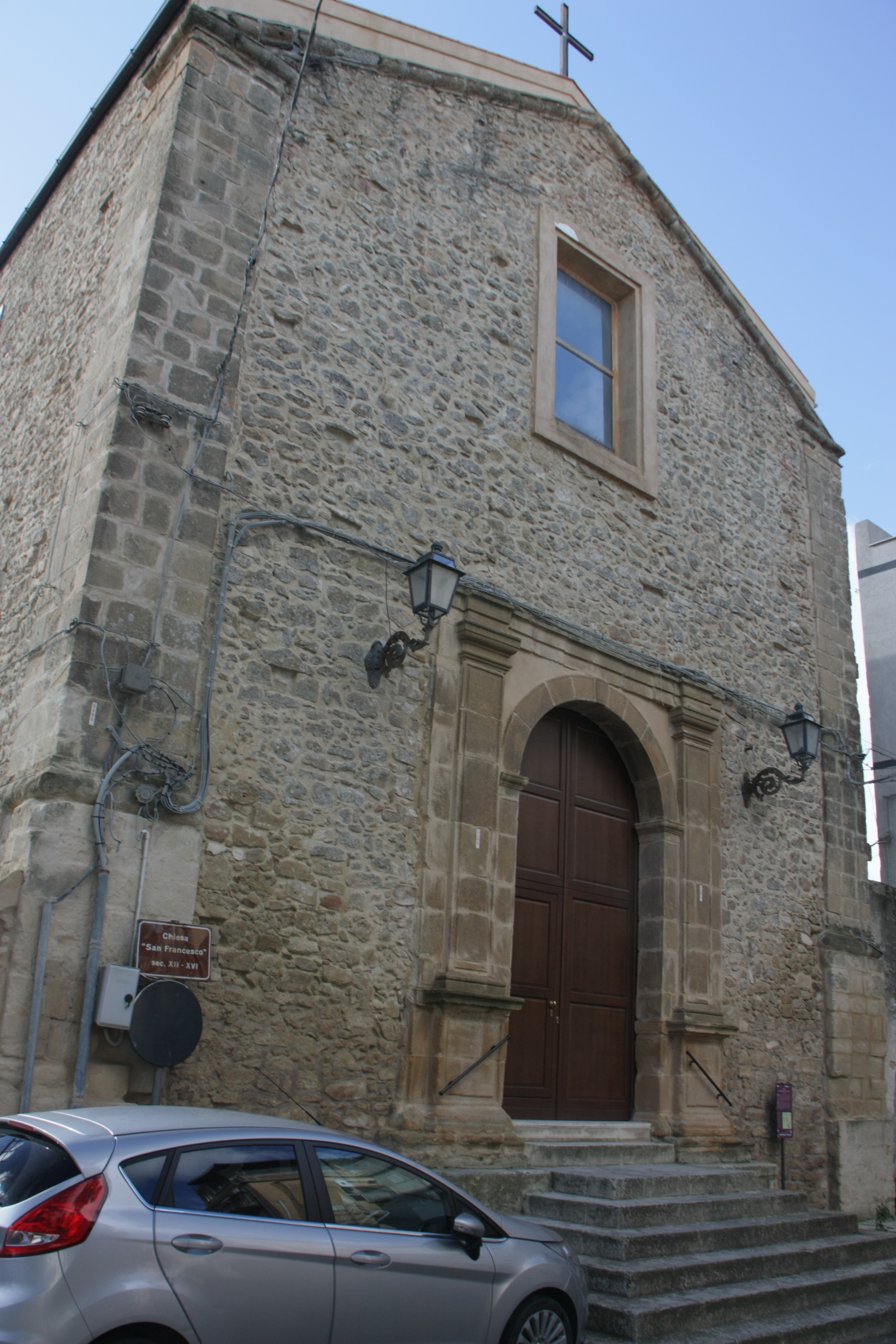
Facade of San Francesco

At this site by the 12th-century, there had been a church, Santa Maria del Castello, affiliated with a Cistercian monastery. In 1577, a Franciscan convent was built adjacent under the guidance of the Maestro Lo Monaco and patronized by Francesco Di Paola from Gelese.

The church contains a wooden cross, dated 1631, with an image of Christ putatively painted by Domenichino. The altarpieces depicting the Assumption of the Virgin Mary and of an Immaculate Conception with St Francis are attributed to Filippo Paladino. The altarpieces of St Michael Archangel, St Francis of Assisi, and Sant'Antonio of Padua were painted by Rocco Di Martino.

A celebration in honor of the Immaculate Conception is held with a bonfire on 8 December.
