= Butera =

- Comune
- District of Butera
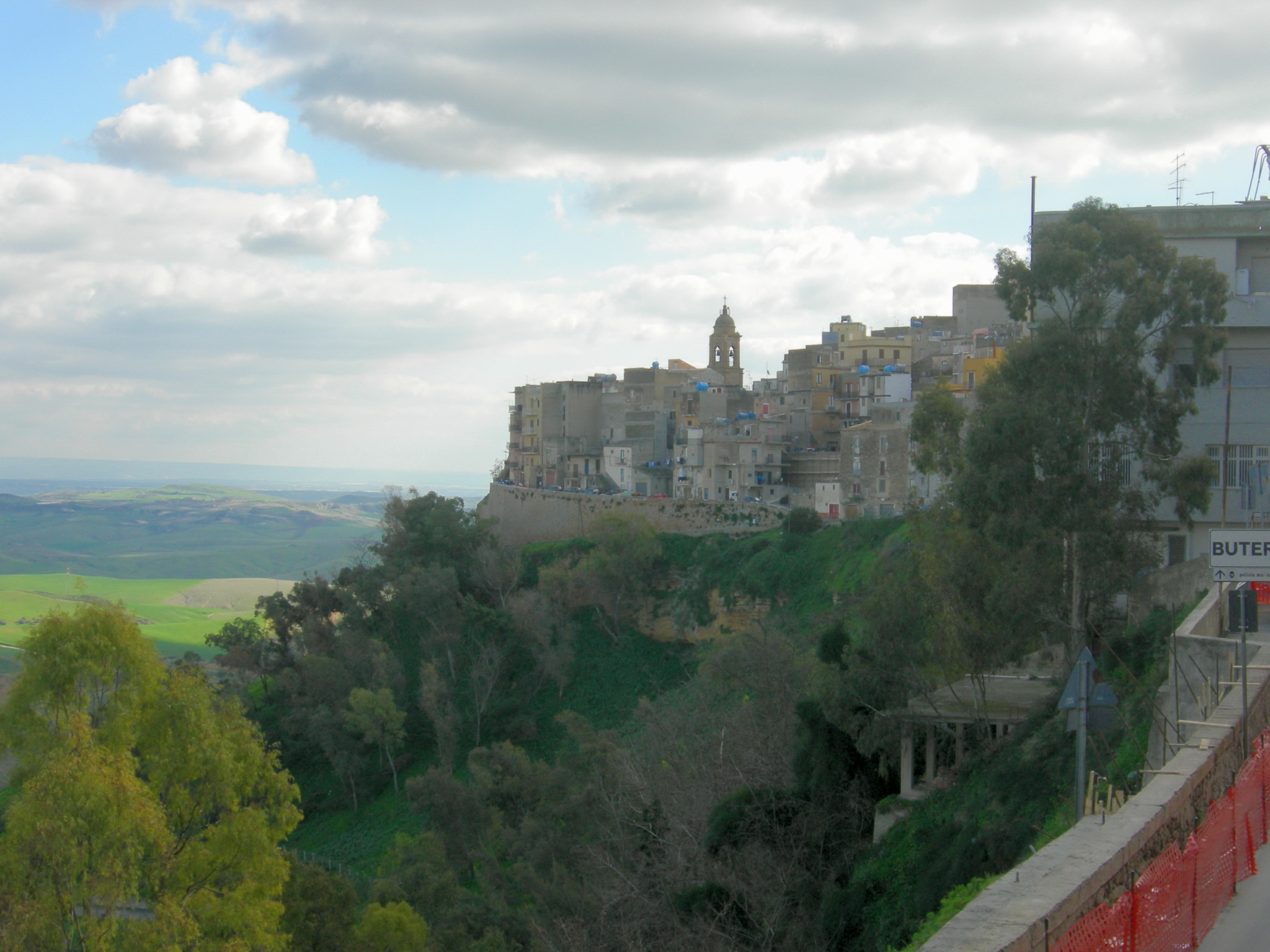

- Coat of arms

- Butera in the Province of Caltanissetta

- Location within Italy Location within Sicily
- Coordinates: 37°11′N 14°11′E
- Country: Italy
- Region: Sicily
- Province: Caltanissetta (CL)
- Frazioni: Butera Scalo, Falconara, Marina di Butera, Piano della Fiera, Tenutella

Government
  - Mayor: Filippo Balbo

Area
  - Total: 295 km^{2} (114 sq mi)
- Elevation: 402 m (1,319 ft)

Population (2025)
  - Total: 4,081
  - Density: 13.8/km^{2} (35.8/sq mi)
- Demonym: Buteresi
- Time zone: UTC+1 (CET)
  - Summer (DST): UTC+2 (CEST)
- Postal code: 93011
- Dialing code: 0934
- Patron saint: St. Roch
- Saint day: August 16
- Website: Official website

Butera (Sicilian: Vutera) is an Italian town and commune in the province of Caltanissetta, in the southern part of the island of Sicily. It is bounded by the communes of Gela, Licata, Mazzarino, Ravanusa and Riesi. It is located 49 km (30 mi) from Caltanissetta, the province's capital, and has a population of 4,081.

== Etymology ==
The etymology of the name Butera is debated.

One hypothesis is that the name is of Arabic origin. Butera was called Butirah by the Arabs, which means "steep place". The Arabic demonym al-Buthayri was used to refer to a person from Butera (Arabic: Buthayr). Butera is also a common name of people in Rwanda (East Africa) where most of men and boys are given this name as a sign of strength.

Another would suggest that the name "Butera" is of Greek origin, and several contemporary scholars tend to reject the Arabic theory of Butera's etymology. This is upheld by Giovan Battista Pellegrini, who claims that "The Arabic form for Butera, always with the interdental, should be an indication of a Greek etymon with / d / (the etymological assumptions from Arabic do not satisfy)". Upholders of a Greek origin for the Butera have suggested that the word may come from bothèr (shepherd), boutherès (country which permits for summer pasture), boutyros (butter merchant) or bouteron (butter). B. Pace himself has asserted that the term, aside from boutherès, may derive also from the Graeco-Byzantine word patela (plain), which refers to Butera's location.

== Archaeology ==
In the area of "Piano fiera" (a new neighborhood built below the old town) where a prehistoric necropolis still stands, is a construction called "dolmen cysts" made of stone slabs assembled in cubiform manner (a style found also throughout Sardinia). Used also in the Greek period, the monument is associated with cult practices, both Hellenic and indigenous, and characterised by the positioning of human remains inside urns (Gk: enchytrismόs) which, in turn, were placed inside these small chambers.

The history of this territory, at the time of Greek colonization, is not documented by ancient historians, and can only be reconstructed on the basis of archaeological research. Until the eighth century BC the tombs of Piano fiera do not show any relationship with the Greek area, but starting from the second half of the seventh century they were associated with rich grave goods imported from Greece.

== History ==
The origins of Butera date back to the Early Bronze Age. During the 6th century BC, the town—then likely the Omphace described by Pausanias—was abandoned and was rebuilt only during the period of Timoleon, shortly after the middle of the fourth century BC It was, however, a small village inhabited by farmers, subject to external aggression throughout the early Middle Ages. Butera, being situated close to Gela, one of the most prominent ancient Greek cities of Sicily under Magna Graecia, was itself settled by Greeks, especially from Crete. The dialect spoken in the region was Doric Greek.

Butera was captured by the Aghlabids during the Muslim conquest of Sicily, following a 5-month siege in 853. Out of the three valli of Sicily, it was part of the Val di Noto, in the southeastern corner of the island. Following the fall of Butera to the Normans in 1091, the town's Muslim leaders were resettled in Calabria to prevent them from fomenting rebellion among the rest of the population. However, a mosque in the town is recorded even in the 12th century, as with certain other Sicilian cities such as Catania, Syracuse, Segesta and Alcamo. It was one of the last Muslim strongholds to fall, due to stubborn resistance, and was described as "one of the strongest outposts of anti-Norman sentiment." A notable Buteresi of the Norman period was 12th century poet and Quran reciter 'Abd ar-Rahman ibn Muhammed ibn 'Umar al-Buthayri, who wrote: "No life can be serene, save that in the shadows of sweet Sicily."

Following Butera's conquest by the Normans, it became an important Lombard town and indeed was the capital of the prominent County of Butera under the Aleramici, a noble Northwest Italian family of Frankish origin, as well as the Alagona, an Aragonese family, from 1089 to 1392. Settlers from Northern Italy (including Lombardy, Piedmont, Liguria and Emilia-Romagna) as well as southern France migrated to the county, which is reflected in the presence of Gallo-Italic dialects which are still spoken in certain Sicilian towns such as Piazza Armerina and Aidone. Butera itself was re-populated with Swabians from southern Germany following its destruction by William I as a reaction to anti-monarchical resistance in 1161.

In 1392, the Alagona family lost possession of the County following their defeat by Martin I, and was passed to the Catalan prince Ugo of Santapau. In 1543, Ambrogio Santapau was nominated Prince of Butera, after defeating Hayreddin Barbarossa, the Ottoman pirate. Up until the 19th century, this was Sicily's main feudal title.

In Butera, 12–13% of the population carries the sickle-cell trait, and its prevalence amongst the town's citizens is believed to be due to selective pressure against malaria. While some sources claim that it was introduced by the Muslim conquerors, other scientific studies claim that it was brought by the Greeks. At present, approximately 7% of the surnames in the city (457 out of 1,732) are attributed to a possible Hellenic origin.

== Demographics ==
Historical population

Year	Pop.	±%
1861	5,157	—
1871	5,304	+2.9%
1881	5,739	+8.2%
1901	6,955	+21.2%
1911	7,528	+8.2%
1921	7,522	−0.1%
1931	8,656	+15.1%
1936	9,139	+5.6%

Year	Pop.	±%
1951	10,675	+16.8%
1961	9,498	−11.0%
1971	7,132	−24.9%
1981	6,238	−12.5%
1991	5,673	−9.1%
2001	5,376	−5.2%
2011	4,937	−8.2%
2021	4,199	−14.9%

Source: ISTAT

== Main sights ==
- Arab-Norman Castle: from the 9th century
- Cathedral: dedicated to Saint Thomas and found in the Piazza Duomo, it was built in the 16th century.
- Sanctuary of San Rocco: built in the 18th century
- Necropolis of Piano della Fiera: in use until the 6th century BC and the Hellenistic phase, its origins date to prehistoric times
- Porta Reale (Royal Gate): given this name because it was entered by Norman count Roger I with a troop of Lombard soldiers
- Piazza Dante: the city's main square, with the town hall and the Church of S. Giuseppe (St Joseph)
- San Francesco: oldest church in the town, it was founded by the first Norman Christians and became a church of Franciscan friars.

== References and notes ==
- This article contains information translated from the Italian Wikipedia article

== Twin cities ==
- Gevelsberg, Germany
- Gambellara, Italy
