= Greek baths of Gela =

Ancient Hellenistic baths in Sicily

Coordinates: 37°4′21.38″N 14°13′49.66″E

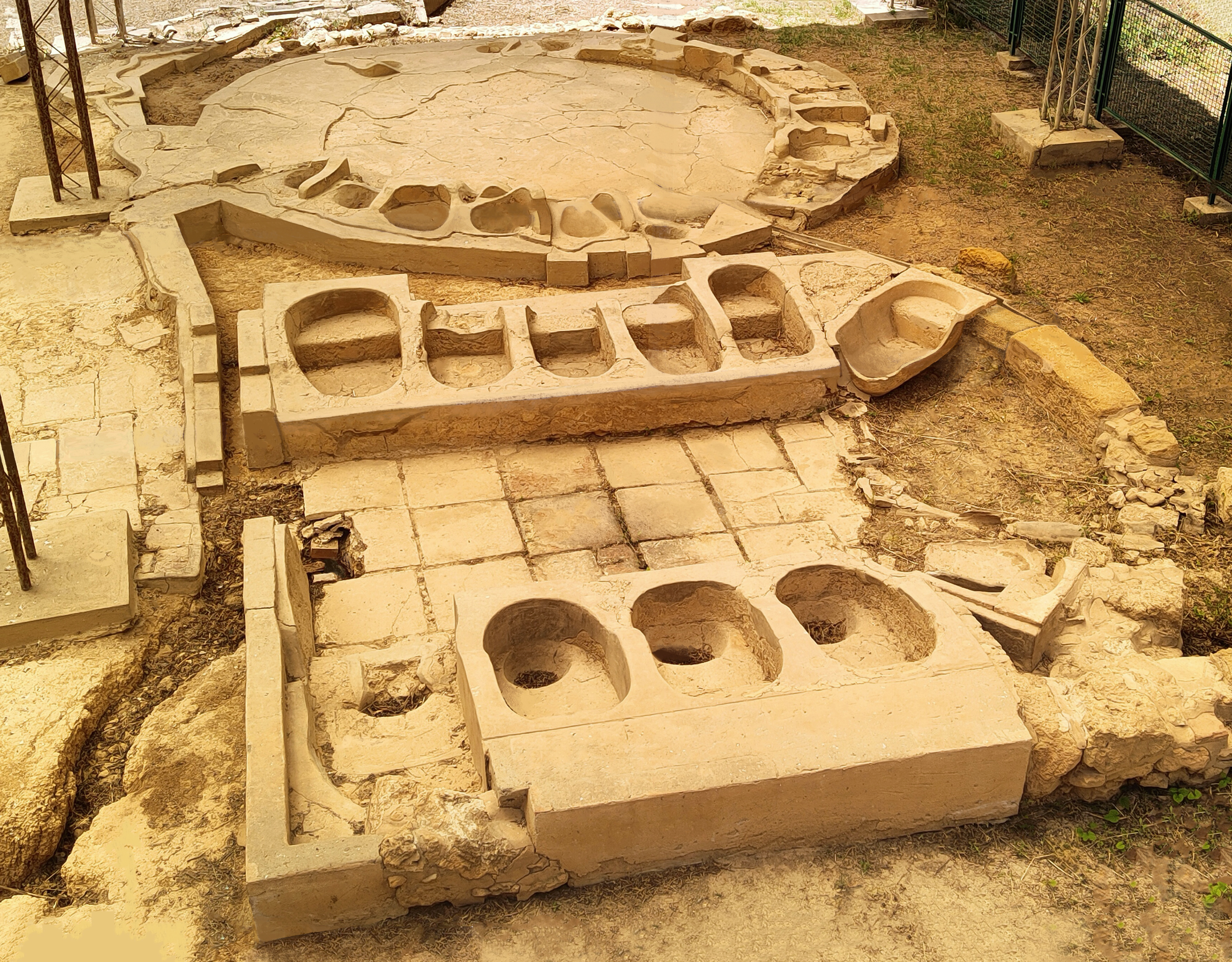
- View of the site from above
- Interactive map of Greek baths of Gela
- Cultures: Ancient Greece
- Location: Gela, Caltanissetta, Sicily, Italy

Site notes
- Excavation dates: 1957
- Management: Soprintendenza di Caltanissetta
- Public access: yes

The Greek Baths of Gela are ancient baths which were discovered in 1957, near the Ospizio di Mendicità on via Europa, Capo Soprano, which date to the Hellenistic period. Like the rest of the city, the baths were demolished in 282 BC after the conquest of the city by the tyrant Phintias.

== Structure ==
The complex consists of two rooms, originally separated by a crude clay brick wall, which was probably plastered. It was probably covered by a terracotta roof, in line with a building technique which was very common in the city from its foundation (examples in the Bosco Littorio archaeological area).

=== Room 1 ===
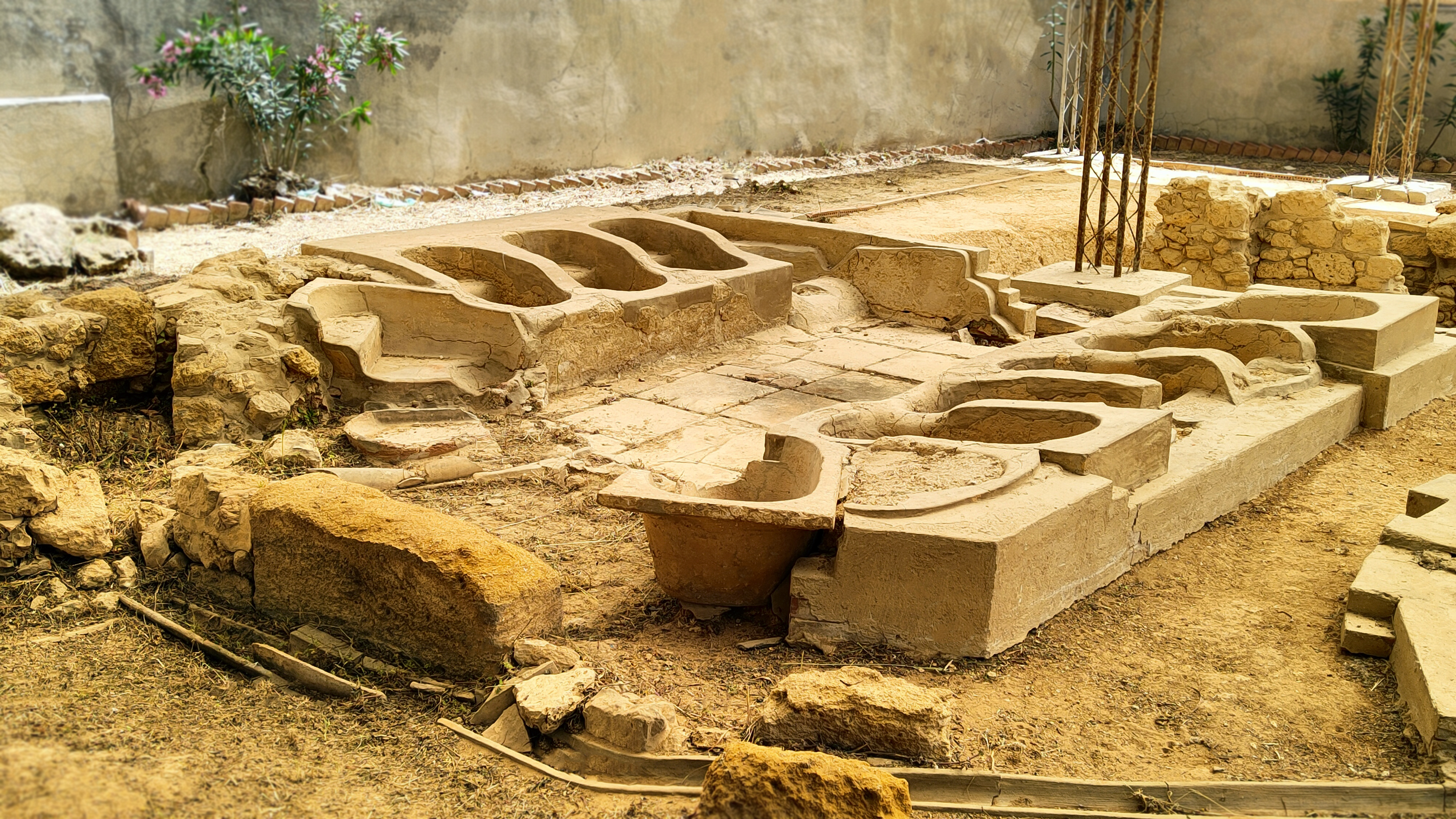
First group of tubs

The first of the two rooms (located at the northwest) contains two groups of tubs, arranged in radial groups and linked by a system of water pipes. The first of these two groups contains fourteen tubs arranged in a horseshoe pattern. Only two of the tubs in this group have been lost. These tubs are designed to be sat up in, as is normal for Greek bath tubs. There is a semicircular cavity below the tubs which must have been intended to catch water which overflowed the tubs. Since there is no drain, this water must have been removed from the room by hand.

The tubs are mostly made from a conglomerate cement made of sherds of terracotta and sandstone rubble, although a few of the baths furthest to the west are entirely made in terracotta and are portable (perhaps they belong to the same period as the pavement and, like this, belong to the most ancient period of the bathhouse).

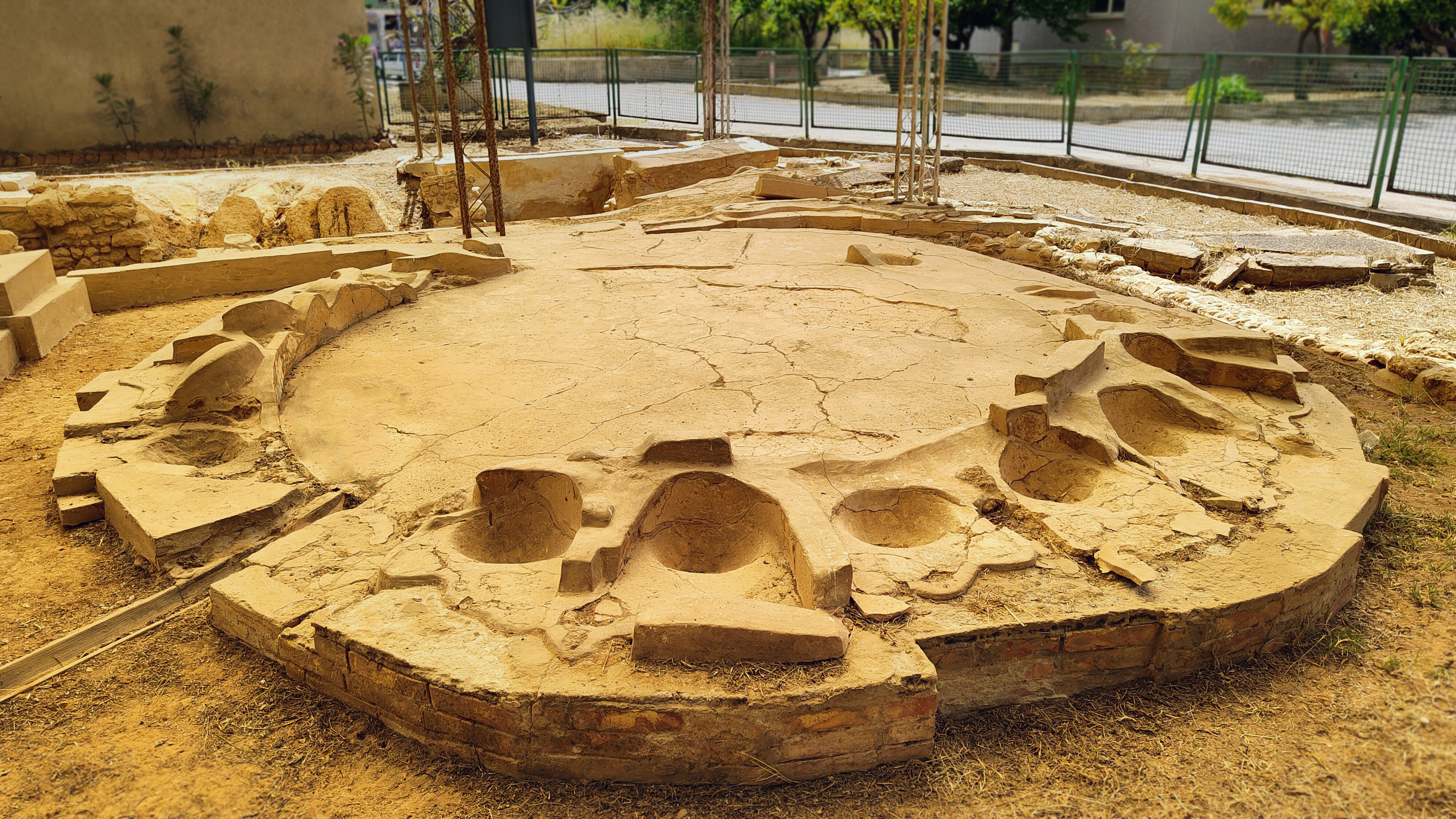
Second group of tubs

The second group consists of twenty-two tubs arranged in a circle on a conglomerate pavement, but they were all damaged by the destruction of the site and may never have been completed.

=== Room 2 ===
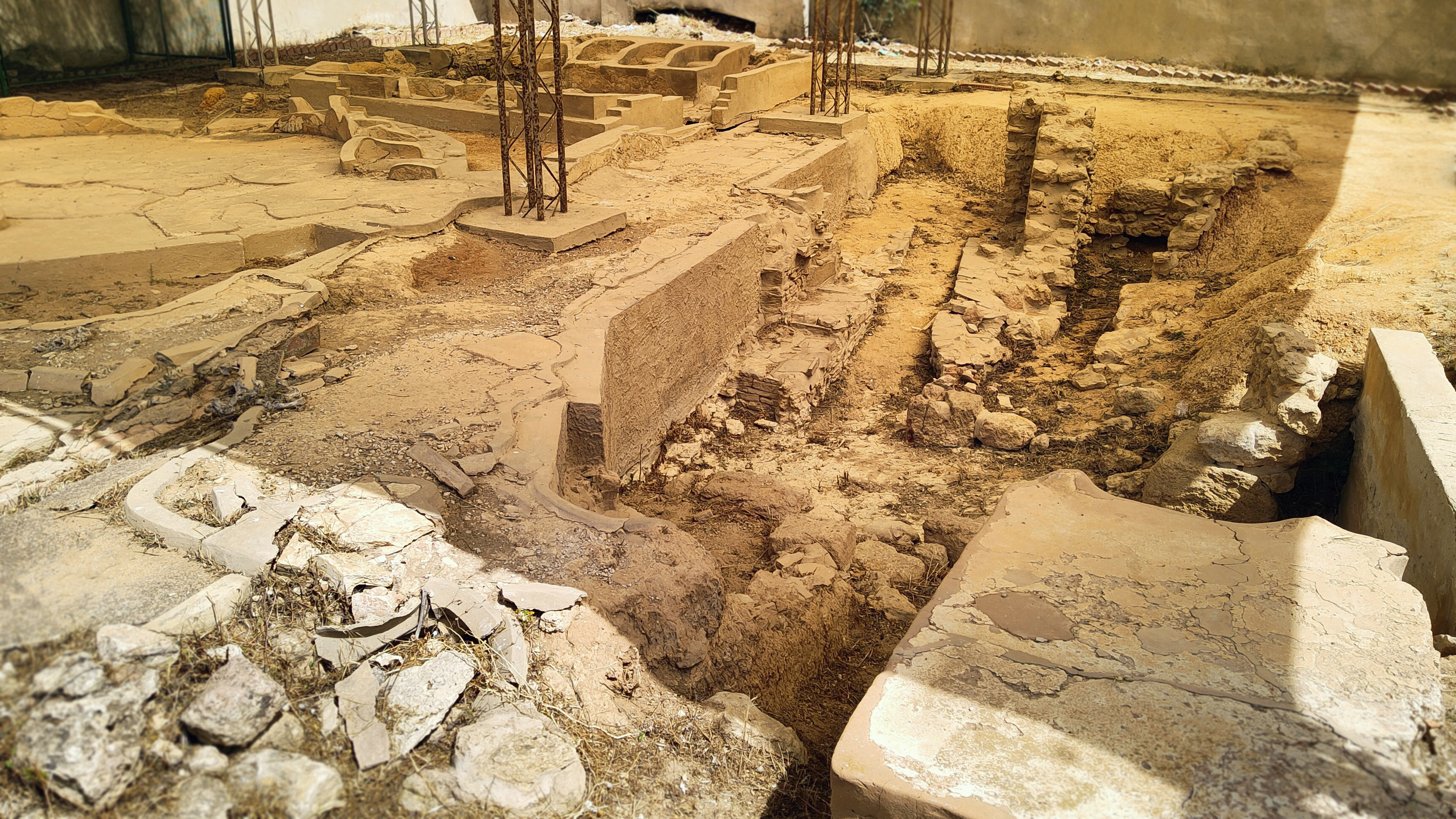
Remains of the underground heating system

The second room (east) consisted of a complex heating system with a small room with two corridors branching off from it, where fires were lit, and of an upper room whose floor must have rested on the walls of the heating complex, in order to create a hypocaust room, perhaps for a sauna.

== Date ==
The complex, the only example of its type in Sicily, has parallels only in Delphi, Colophon, Olympia, and Gortys. The structural similarity and the items discovered (perfume bottles, Italic and Punic amphorae, as well as Syracusan, Geloan and Siculo-Punic coins from the time of Timoleon) all help to date the site between the fourth and third centuries BC. The structure experienced several renovations: the creation of the conglomerate tubs in the first group of tubs in the first room, the creation of the second group tubs in the first room, the creation of the second room, the reinforcement of the northwestern part of room 1 with a stone wall.

== See also ==
- Greek Baths in ancient Olympia

== Bibliography ==
- A. Ambrogi, Vasche in età romana in marmi bianchi e colorati, Roma 1995.
- P. Orlandini, "Gela. Impianto greco di bagni pubblici presso l'ospizio," in Notizie degli scavi 1960.
