= Gela =

- Comune
- Comune di Gela
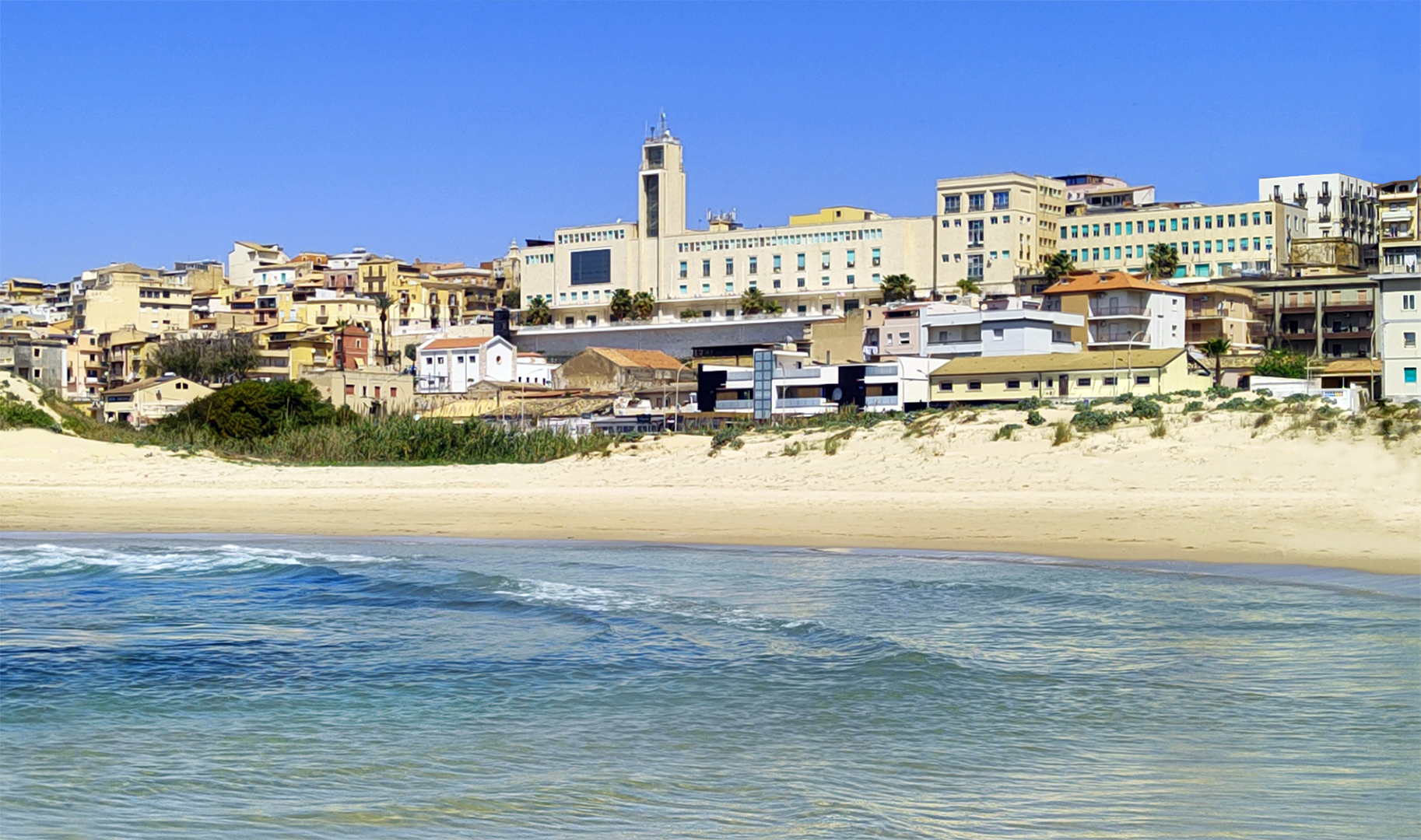
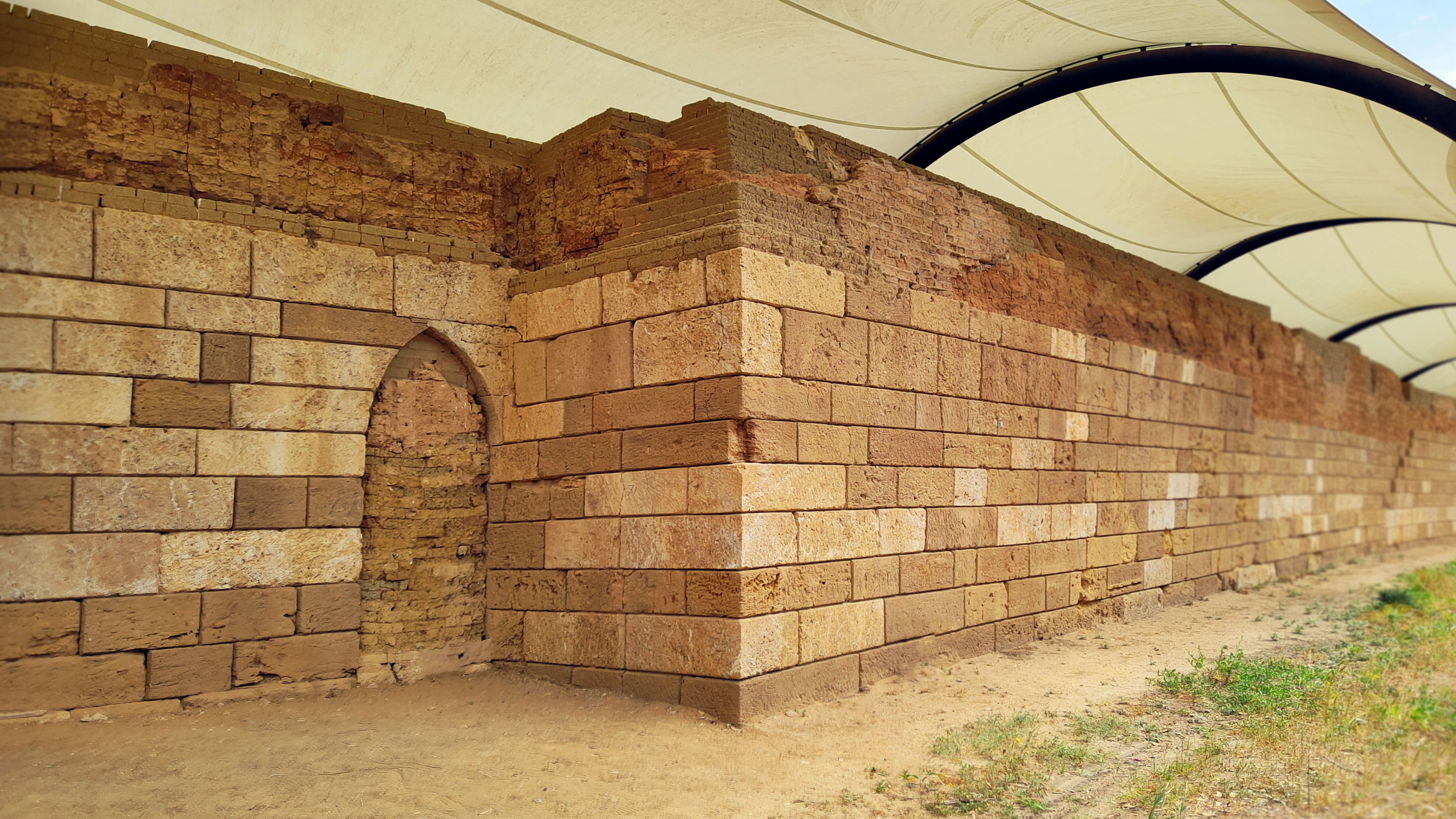
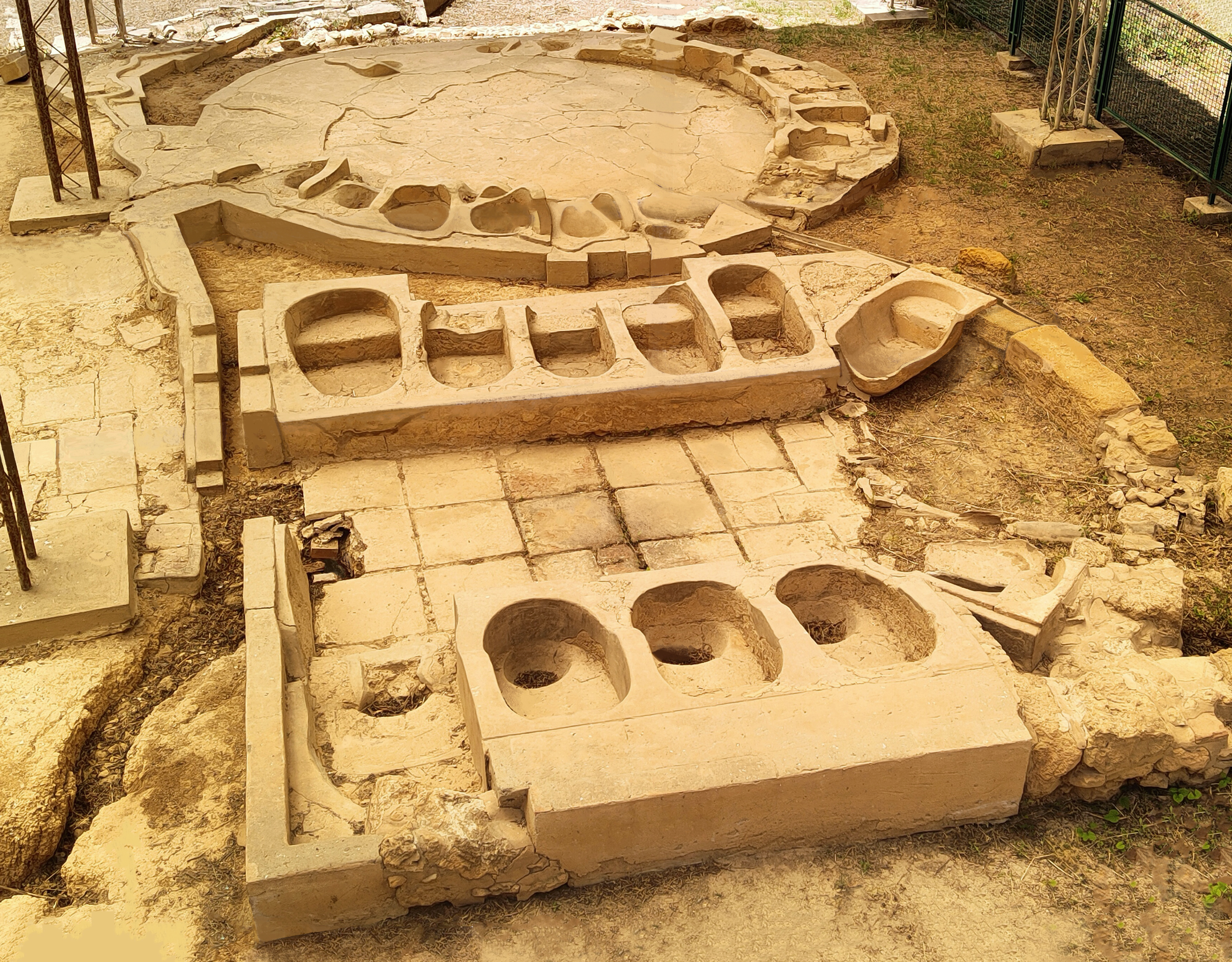
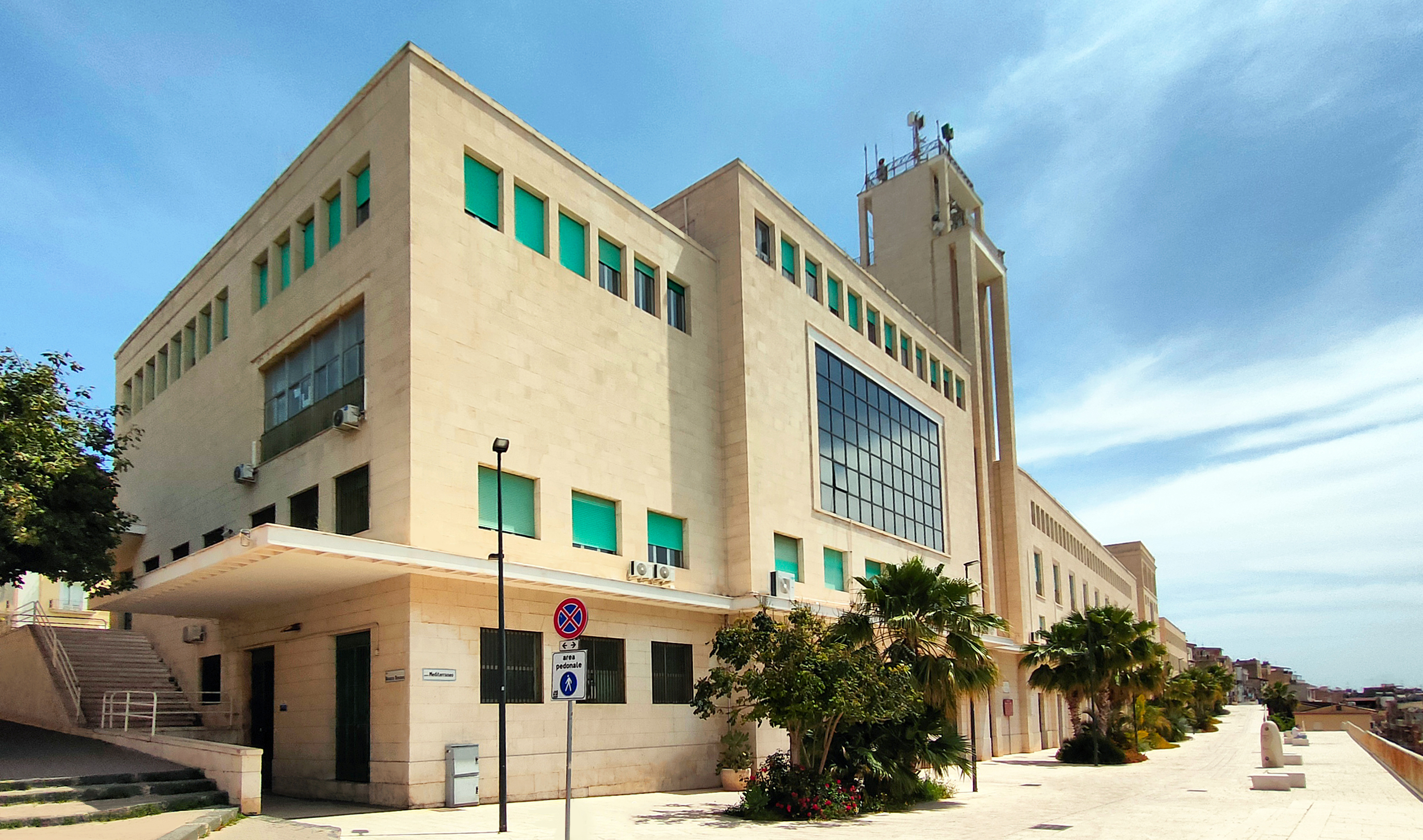
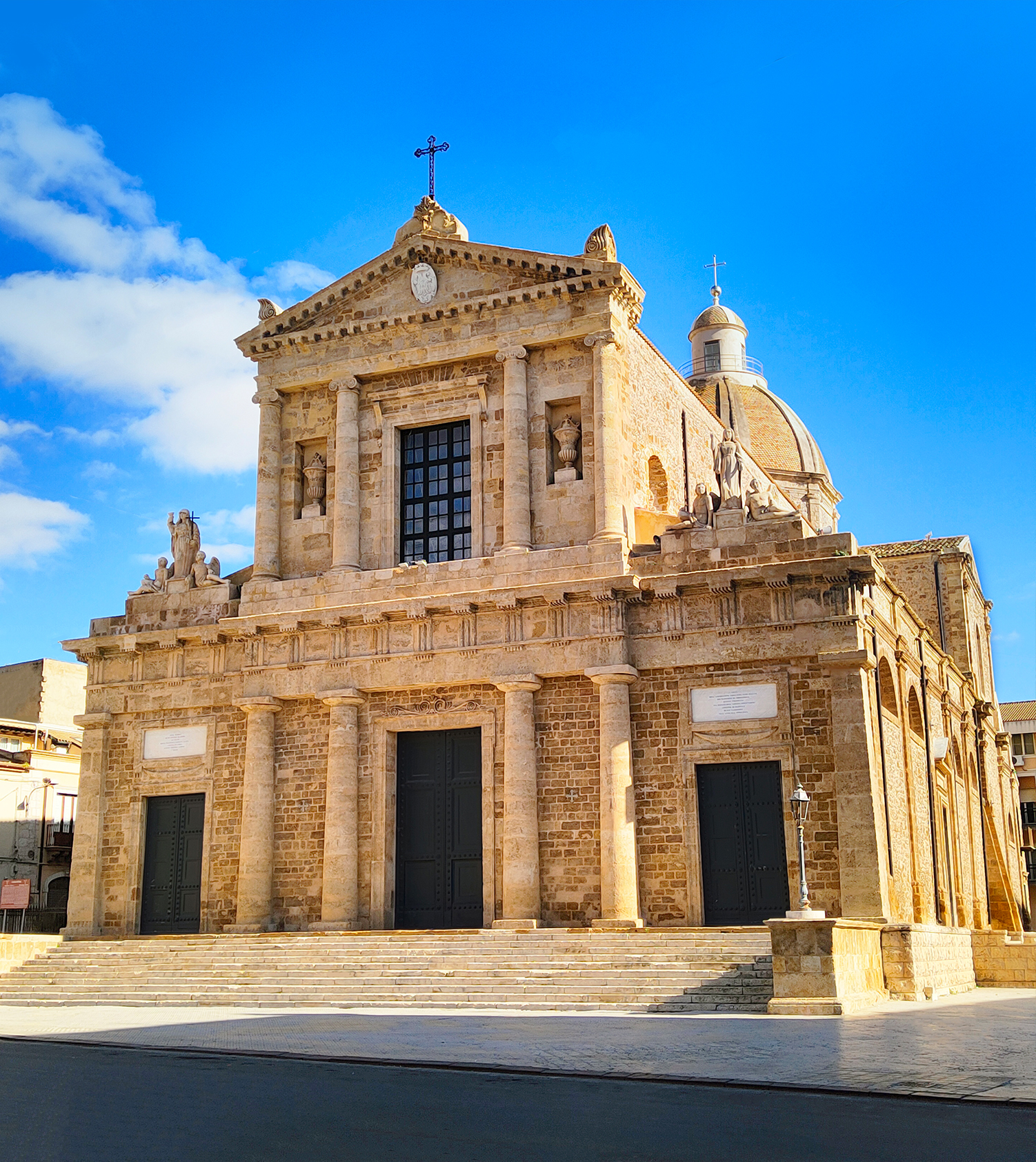
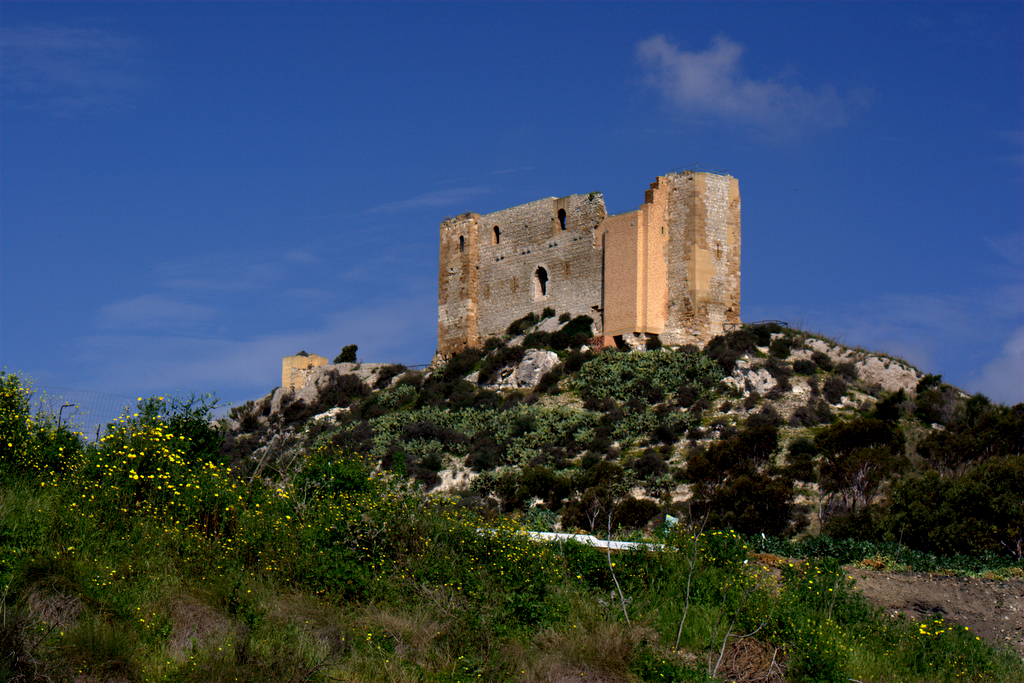
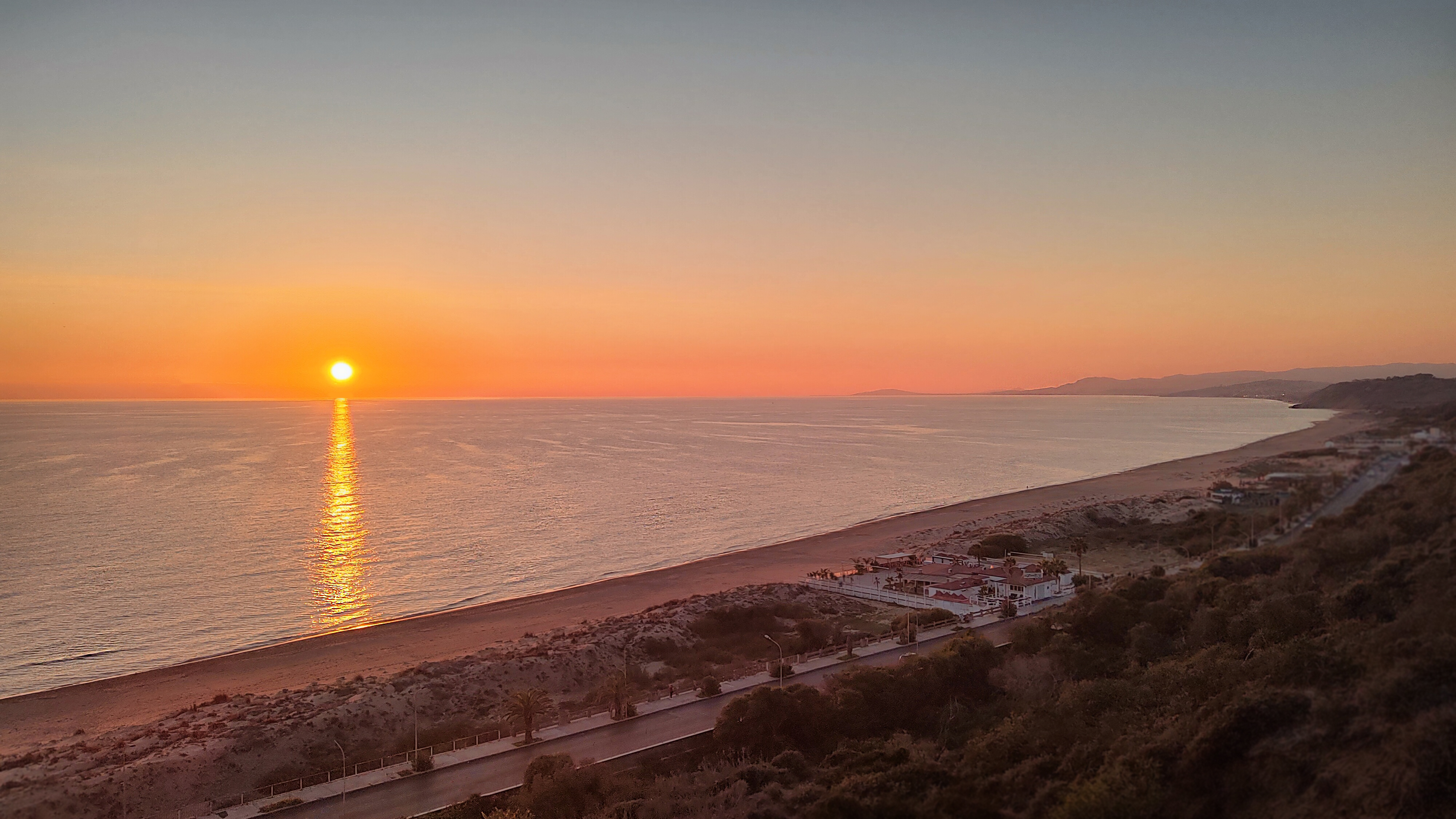
- City seen from the beach Timoleon Walls Greek Baths City Hall Mother Church The Castelluccio Gulf of Gela

- Flag Coat of arms
- Motto: Heraclea civitas antiquissima
- Location within Italy Location within Sicily
- Coordinates: 37°04′N 14°15′E
- Country: Italy
- Region: Sicily
- Province: Caltanissetta (CL)
- Frazioni: Manfria

Government
  - Mayor: Giuseppe Terenziano Di Stefano

Area
  - Total: 276 km^{2} (107 sq mi)
- Elevation: 46 m (151 ft)

Population (30 September 2025)
  - Total: 70,215
  - Density: 254/km^{2} (659/sq mi)
- Demonym: Gelesi
- Time zone: UTC+1 (CET)
  - Summer (DST): UTC+2 (CEST)
- Postal code: 93012
- Dialing code: 0933
- ISTAT code: 085007
- Patron saint: St. Maria dell'Alemanna
- Saint day: 8 September
- Website: Official website

Gela (Sicilian and Italian pronunciation: [ˈdʒɛːla]; Ancient Greek: Γέλα) is a city and comune (municipality) in the Autonomous Region of Sicily, Italy; in terms of area and population, it is the largest municipality on the southern coast of Sicily. Gela is part of the Province of Caltanissetta and is one of the few comuni in Italy with a population and area that exceed those of the provincial capital.

Historical population
| Year | Pop. | ±% |
|---|---|---|
| 1861 | 13,754 | — |
| 1871 | 14,851 | +8.0% |
| 1881 | 17,328 | +16.7% |
| 1901 | 22,019 | +27.1% |
| 1911 | 23,996 | +9.0% |
| 1921 | 25,902 | +7.9% |
| 1931 | 30,547 | +17.9% |
| 1936 | 32,885 | +7.7% |
| 1951 | 43,678 | +32.8% |
| 1961 | 54,774 | +25.4% |
| 1971 | 67,058 | +22.4% |
| 1981 | 74,806 | +11.6% |
| 1991 | 72,535 | −3.0% |
| 2001 | 72,774 | +0.3% |
| 2011 | 75,668 | +4.0% |
| 2021 | 71,937 | −4.9% |
Source: ISTAT

Gela was founded around 688 BC by Greek colonists from Rhodes and Crete; it was an influential polis of Magna Graecia in the 7th and 6th centuries BC and became one of the most powerful cities until the 5th c. BC. Aeschylus, the famous playwright, lived here and died in 456 BC. In 1943, during the Invasion of Sicily, the Allied forces made their first landing on the island at Gela.

== History ==
=== Ancient era ===
Archaeology has shown that the acropolis of Gela was occupied during the Copper Age in the 4th millennium BC and during the Bronze Age in the 2nd millennium BC.

Gela was founded around 688 BC by colonists from Rhodes and Crete, 45 years after the founding of Syracuse. Archaeology has shown that they chose to settle on the northern slope of the Molino a Vento extending for more than 400 m towards the west up to Castelluccio.

The city was named after the river Gela, the name of which derives from gela, the Sicilian-dialect word for "winter frost". According to Diodorus Siculus, the city was founded by Antiphemus and Entimus.

Gela immediately had violent clashes with the Sicani of the area: Antiphemus waged a war against the city of Omphace, not far from Gela. The Gelans won and defeated the city, also taking away a statue that was said to have been made by the mythical sculptor Daedalus.

The Temple of Athena Lindia, protector of the city, was built on the acropolis over the protohistoric remains in the 7th century BC, This was then incorporated into a second temple in the 6th century, also dedicated to Athena.

The Greeks established many colonies in Magna Graecia and for many centuries they had a major influence on the area. Gela flourished and the expansionist policy of the tyrants of Gela, in particular Cleander and especially Hippocrates, led to the city founding a series of satellite colonies, including Akragas (Agrigento), and also managed to subdue several cities: Kallipolis (according to some, today's Giarre), Leontini (Lentini), Naxos (Sicily) (Giardini-Naxos) and Zancle (Messina). Only Syracuse, with the help of her former colonizing city Corinth and Corcyra managed to escape. When Kamarina, a Syracusan colony, rebelled in 492 BC, Hippocrates intervened to wage war against Syracuse. After defeating the Syracusan army at the Heloros river, Hippocrates besieged the city but was persuaded to retreat in exchange for possession of Camarina. Hippocrates died in 491 BC in a battle against the Siculi, the native Sicilian people.

Hippocrates was succeeded by Gelon, who in 484 BC conquered Syracuse and moved his seat of government there. His brother Hiero was given control over Gela. When Theron of Agrigento conquered Himera and a Carthaginian army disembarked in Sicily to counter him, he asked for help from Gela and Syracuse. Gelo and Hiero were victorious in the subsequent battle of Himera, in which the Carthaginian leader Hamilcar died.

After the death of Gelon in 478 BC, Hiero moved to Syracuse, leaving Gela to Polyzelos. Many of the Geloi returned from Syracuse in this period and the city regained some of its power. Aeschylus died in this city in 456 BC. Valerius Maximus wrote that Aeschylus was killed outside the city by a tortoise dropped by an eagle which had mistaken his head for a rock suitable for shattering the shell, and killed him. Pliny, in his Naturalis Historiæ, adds that Aeschylus had been staying outdoors to avoid a prophecy that he would be killed by a falling object. In 425 BC during the Sicilian wars, Gela was an ally of Syracuse, while Kamarina was on the opposing side although they were traditional allies. They concluded an armistice in the late summer. Since a bilateral peace was unlikely to last if the rest of the island remained at war, the two cities invited all the belligerents to convene and discuss peace terms. The cities not only sent ambassadors but also granted them unusually broad power to conduct diplomacy. In 424 BC at the Congress of Gela, the Sicilian cities made peace on the basis of "Sicily for the Sicilians".

Gela fought the Sicilian League that pushed back the Athenian attempt to conquer the island in 415 BC (see Sicilian Expedition).

In 406 BC, the Carthaginians conquered Agrigento and destroyed it. Gela asked for the help of Dionysius I of Syracuse but Dionysius did not arrive and, after heroic deeds, the following year, Gela was ruined and its treasures sacked. The survivors took refuge in Syracuse. In 397 BC, they returned in Gela and joined Dionysius II in his struggle for freedom from the invaders and in 383 BC their independence was acknowledged.

Timoleon rebuilt the city walls in 338 BC after the destruction by the Carthaginians. The Acropolis lost its sacred character and was populated with houses arranged on the flanks of the hill. The monumental area of the city was moved to Capo Soprano.

Under Agathocles (317-289 BC), the city again suffered internal strife between the people and the aristoi (aristocrats). When the Carthaginians arrived in 311 BC, they met little resistance and captured the city with the help of the aristoi. The acropolis site at Molino a Vento was then definitively abandoned.

In 282 BC Phintias of Agrigento ruthlessly destroyed Gela to crush its power forever and transferred its population to his new city of Phintias next to present-day Licata. This assertion, however, seems to be refuted by a careful reading of the sources that name the Mamertines as the real destroyers of the city, five years earlier.

=== Roman, Byzantine and mediaeval ages ===
The city subsequently disappeared from the chronicles. Under Roman rule, a small settlement, which is mentioned by Virgil, Pliny the Elder, Cicero, and Strabo, still existed. Later it was a minor Byzantine center. Under the Arabs, it was known as the "City of Columns".

A later city called "Terranova", by which name it remained known until 1928, was founded in 1233 by Frederick II. The new settlement was located west of ancient Gela, and was provided with a castle and a line of walls. Terranova, also known as Heracles, was a royal possession until 1369, when King Frederick III of Aragon gave it to Manfredi III Chiaramonte. In 1401, however, after the treason of Andrea Chiaramonte, the city was confiscated and was assigned to several Aragonese feudataries. In 1530, the title of Marquis of Terranova was created for Giovanni Tagliavia Aragona, and in 1561, his son Carlo obtained the title of Duke. The Terranova Aragona held the city until 1640, when the marriage of Giovanna Tagliavia Aragona and Ettore Pignatelli give the possession to the Pignatelli, who held the fiefdom until 1812.

=== Modern era ===
Terranova was renamed Terranova di Sicilia, and in 1927, it was renamed Gela.

In World War II, during the initial assault on 10 July 1943 of the Allied invasion of Sicily, the U.S. 1st Infantry Division and the 82nd Armored Reconnaissance Battalion landed on the beaches of Gela, which were strongly defended by the Livorno Division. The Allied forces repelled an Italian and German armored counter-attack at Gela. The U.S. Army Engineers built several advanced landing airfields, which were used by the Twelfth Air Force during the Italian Campaign, in the area around the city. To this day, numerous preserved bunkers shape the plain of Gela, where the fighting took place.

After the war, a large oil refinery was built in Gela's territory as a part of Eni's industrial expansion plan in South Italy. The refinery was intended to help the region's economy but instead it caused significant damage to the area's visual appearance and touristic appeal and in 2014, the refinery was closed down.

== Geography ==
Gela is situated on the Mediterranean coast at the estuary of Gela river on the south-western side of Sicily. The bounding municipalities are Acate, Butera, Caltagirone, Mazzarino and Niscemi. Its frazione (municipal parish) is the coastal village of Manfria. In geology, Gela gives its name to the Gelasian Age of the Pleistocene Epoch.

=== Climate ===
Gela has a Mediterranean climate (Köppen: Csa). Winters are mild and rainy while summers are dry and hot. Precipitation is higher in autumn and winter.

Climate data for Gela (1991–2020, extremes 1965–present)
| Month | Jan | Feb | Mar | Apr | May | Jun | Jul | Aug | Sep | Oct | Nov | Dec | Year |
|---|---|---|---|---|---|---|---|---|---|---|---|---|---|
| Record high °C (°F) | 22.0 (71.6) | 23.4 (74.1) | 27.6 (81.7) | 33.2 (91.8) | 34.6 (94.3) | 38.0 (100.4) | 41.4 (106.5) | 40.0 (104.0) | 34.4 (93.9) | 33.0 (91.4) | 28.4 (83.1) | 23.6 (74.5) | 41.4 (106.5) |
| Mean daily maximum °C (°F) | 15.5 (59.9) | 15.5 (59.9) | 16.8 (62.2) | 19.2 (66.6) | 22.6 (72.7) | 26.0 (78.8) | 28.3 (82.9) | 29.1 (84.4) | 26.9 (80.4) | 24.0 (75.2) | 20.2 (68.4) | 16.8 (62.2) | 21.7 (71.1) |
| Daily mean °C (°F) | 12.2 (54.0) | 12.1 (53.8) | 13.4 (56.1) | 15.8 (60.4) | 19.3 (66.7) | 22.9 (73.2) | 25.3 (77.5) | 26.3 (79.3) | 23.9 (75.0) | 21.0 (69.8) | 17.2 (63.0) | 13.7 (56.7) | 18.6 (65.5) |
| Mean daily minimum °C (°F) | 9.1 (48.4) | 8.7 (47.7) | 10.0 (50.0) | 12.2 (54.0) | 15.9 (60.6) | 19.9 (67.8) | 22.4 (72.3) | 23.4 (74.1) | 20.9 (69.6) | 17.9 (64.2) | 14.1 (57.4) | 10.7 (51.3) | 15.4 (59.7) |
| Record low °C (°F) | 0.0 (32.0) | 0.0 (32.0) | 0.0 (32.0) | 3.8 (38.8) | 5.8 (42.4) | 11.0 (51.8) | 13.6 (56.5) | 15.6 (60.1) | 12.4 (54.3) | 7.8 (46.0) | 2.4 (36.3) | 1.8 (35.2) | 0.0 (32.0) |
| Average precipitation mm (inches) | 83.7 (3.30) | 59.1 (2.33) | 46.6 (1.83) | 34.7 (1.37) | 12.0 (0.47) | 7.9 (0.31) | 2.9 (0.11) | 3.9 (0.15) | 48.3 (1.90) | 68.3 (2.69) | 87.5 (3.44) | 84.2 (3.31) | 539.2 (21.23) |
| Average precipitation days (≥ 1.0 mm) | 7.4 | 6.8 | 5.6 | 4.4 | 2.3 | 1.0 | 0.3 | 0.6 | 3.7 | 5.0 | 7.5 | 8.0 | 52.4 |
| Average relative humidity (%) | 74.4 | 72.9 | 73.8 | 72.3 | 70.9 | 69.8 | 70.2 | 71.5 | 73.5 | 74.2 | 74.0 | 73.8 | 72.6 |
| Average dew point °C (°F) | 8.2 (46.8) | 7.8 (46.0) | 9.5 (49.1) | 11.5 (52.7) | 14.6 (58.3) | 17.9 (64.2) | 20.3 (68.5) | 21.5 (70.7) | 19.7 (67.5) | 16.9 (62.4) | 12.8 (55.0) | 9.4 (48.9) | 14.2 (57.6) |
| Mean monthly sunshine hours | 185.4 | 186.2 | 230.6 | 255.6 | 307.5 | 325.5 | 357.4 | 335.7 | 263.4 | 225.1 | 188.1 | 173.3 | 3,033.9 |
Source 1: NOAA
Source 2: Servizio Meteorologico (extremes)

Climate data for Gela Osservatorio delle Acque elevation 9 m (29.5 feet) (1981-2010)
| Month | Jan | Feb | Mar | Apr | May | Jun | Jul | Aug | Sep | Oct | Nov | Dec | Year |
|---|---|---|---|---|---|---|---|---|---|---|---|---|---|
| Mean daily maximum °C (°F) | 17.2 (63.0) | 17.3 (63.1) | 18.9 (66.0) | 21.4 (70.5) | 25.1 (77.2) | 28.4 (83.1) | 30.9 (87.6) | 31.7 (89.1) | 29.3 (84.7) | 26.4 (79.5) | 22.0 (71.6) | 18.2 (64.8) | 23.95 (75.11) |
| Mean daily minimum °C (°F) | 8.6 (47.5) | 8.4 (47.1) | 9.8 (49.6) | 11.9 (53.4) | 15.9 (60.6) | 19.7 (67.5) | 22.4 (72.3) | 23.2 (73.8) | 20.9 (69.6) | 17.7 (63.9) | 13.2 (55.8) | 10.0 (50.0) | 15.14 (59.25) |
| Average precipitation mm (inches) | 57.1 (2.25) | 39.4 (1.55) | 34.5 (1.36) | 25.3 (1.00) | 14.0 (0.55) | 5.5 (0.22) | 2.5 (0.10) | 8.7 (0.34) | 28.5 (1.12) | 68.3 (2.69) | 56.1 (2.21) | 60.7 (2.39) | 398.2 (15.68) |
Source: Blog di recordpiana

== Main sights ==
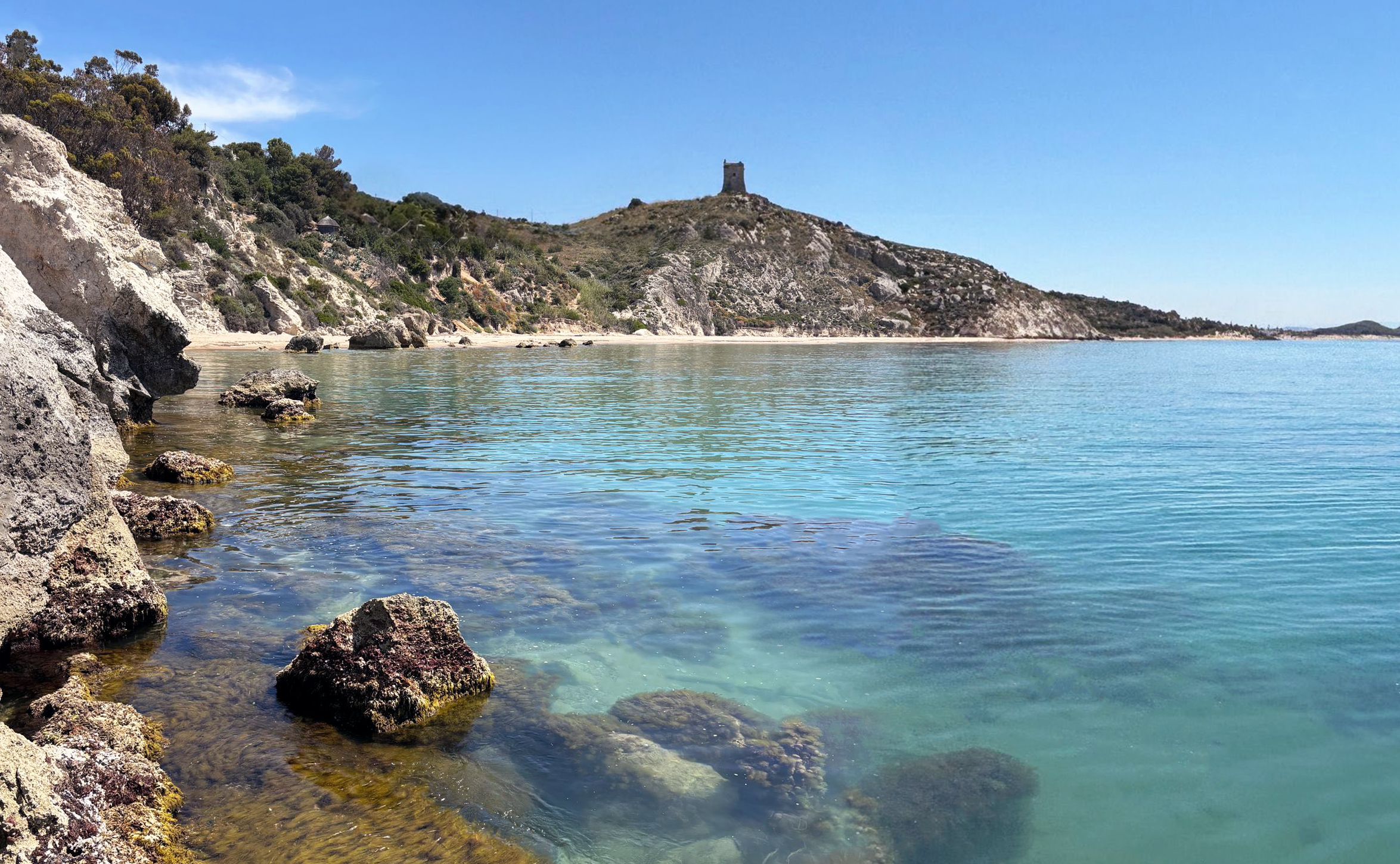
Tower of Manfria seen from the sea

- Greek Acropolis, including the basements of three Greek temples, the oldest of which has an 8-metre (26 ft) Doric column. Its many fine Attic vases are now in various museums.
- The Regional Archeological Museum.
- Timolean Walls (4th century BC), named after Timoleon and located within a large park between the modern city and the coast.
- Bosco Littorio, a large park whee remains of an archaic (7th–6th centuries BC) emporium have been excavated.
- Mother Church, dedicated to the Holy Virgin Assunta, was rebuilt in 1766-1794 over a pre-existing small church of Madonna della Platea. It has two orders façade with Doric and Ionic semi-columns. The interior, with a nave and two aisles, houses a wood with the Transit of the Virgin by Deodato Guidaccia and other 18th centuries canvasses.
- San Francesco d'Assisi church: refurbished in the 17th century with a painted wooden roof and housing an altarpiece depicting the Deposition by Vito D'Anna
- The Castelluccio ("Small Castle"), built in the early 13th century. It is located 10 km (6 mi) from the city.
- Natural Reserve of Biviere di Gela, including a coastal lake surrounded by dunes.
- Manfria, with a typical beach with Mediterranean dune landscape, and the Torre di Manfria ("Manfria Tower").

== Archaeology ==
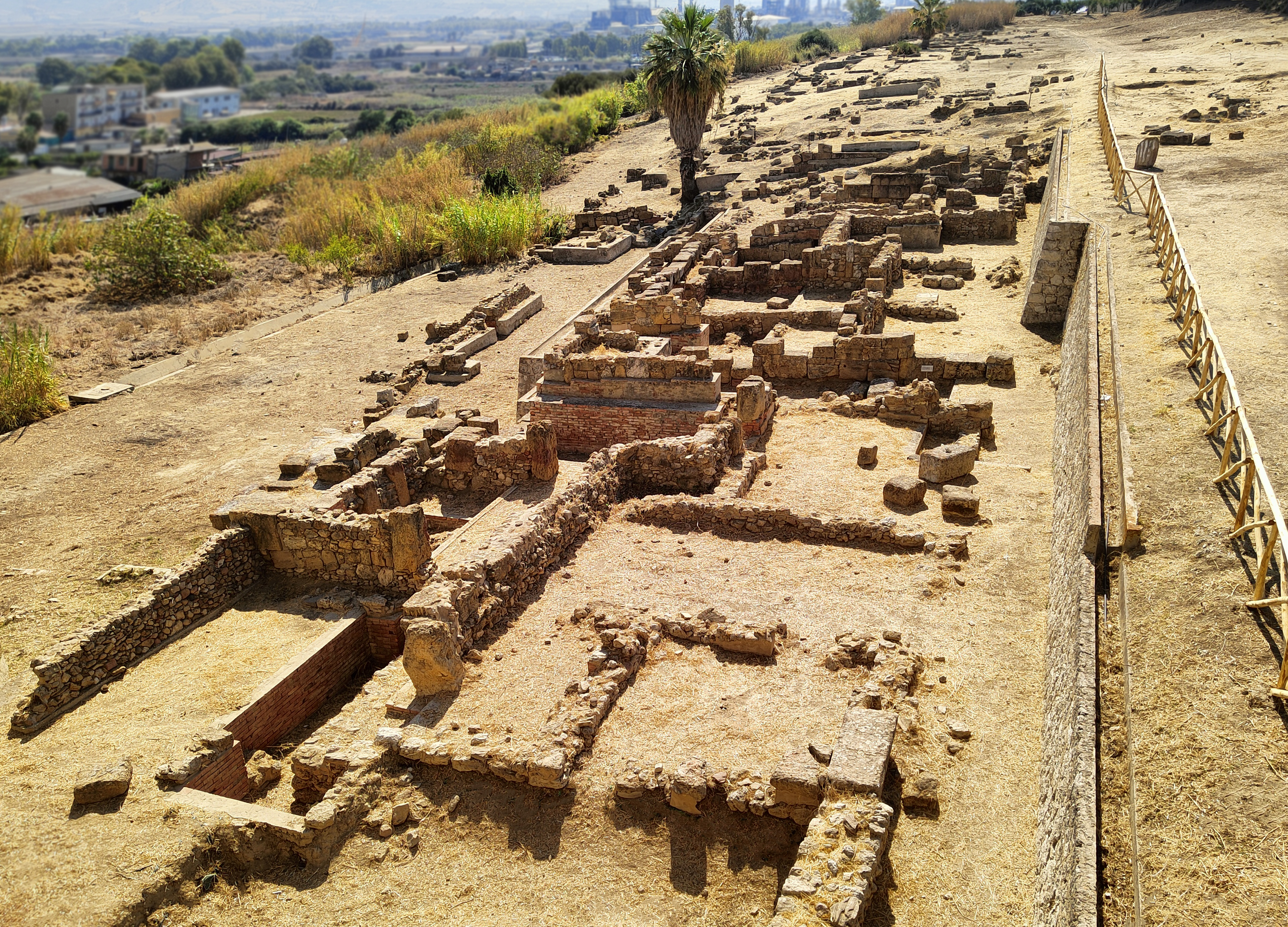
The Acropolis

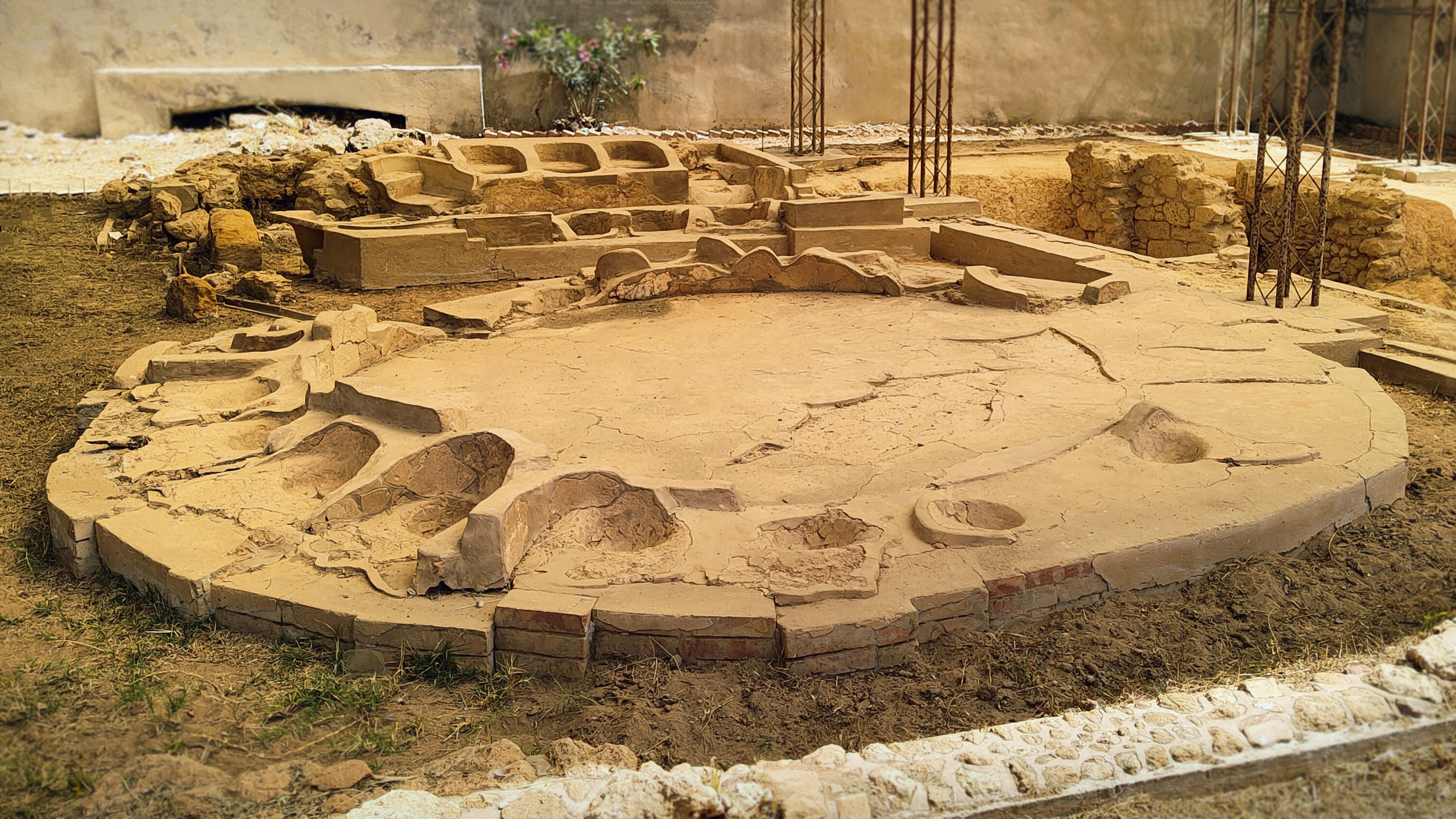
Greek Baths

There are four main archaeological areas that can be visited today: Timolean Walls, the Acropolis, the site of Bosco Littorio and the Greek Baths.

Timolean Walls dates to the 4th century BC. and are almost 400 metres long. The feature that makes them unique is the large squared blocks in calcarenite 3 m high in the lower part and a thick layer of raw or sun-dried clay bricks above which were perfectly preserved. The upper layer was probably added as a quick solution after news of the imminent invasion of the Carthaginians. At some points the walls externally reached a height of almost 10 m. They are considered to be one of the most important discoveries of classical archaeology of the twentieth century as they are testimony of the importance that the ancient Greeks gave to defensive design and engineering as they were designed by an architect down to the smallest detail, with devices and structures intended for specific purposes such as protection from weather and towers, stairs, walkways, drains, buttresses. Inside the walls the military district was brought to light with buildings of clay bricks. Not far away, a large residential area of the same era was discovered.

The Acropolis extends between the mouth of the Gela and the Pasqualello Valley and contains the ruins of houses, shops, temples and the Hippodamian road system (with the plateia and the stenopoi). The sacred area extended to the north: today only the bases of three temples are visible. Of the largest, temple C or Athenaion, a Doric-style column (almost 8 m high) remains standing and is one of the city's symbols. Until 405 BC the acropolis housed the most important sacred buildings of Gela but after the destruction by the Carthaginians, houses were built over the acropolis after the rise to power of Timoleon.

In the Bosco Littorio, south of the Acropolis, the extensive emporium (7th–6th century BC) complex near the port at mouth of the river has been recently brought to light and restored. The emporium included workshops, warehouses and shops. The Museum of Navigation is also located on this area.

The Greek baths of Gela in via Europa are unique in Sicily and consist of two rooms; the one located to the north west consists of two groups of bathtubs connected by a wastewater system that surrounds a central space. The bathtubs that make up the first of the two groups are arranged in a horseshoe and have a particular shape. While only two seats of this first group have been lost, those of the second group are all missing the upper half (perhaps never completed). The material used for the tubs was an agglomeration of terracotta fragments and sandstone debris while some seats are entirely in terracotta.

Among recent discoveries in the area are:

- the oldest Greek wreck (500 BC), unique of its kind, which will be exhibited in the Museum of Navigation
- in 2009 a fourth ancient boat near the mouth of the Dirillo, an underwater archaeological site on the coast of the Bulala district. The 3 other boats are in the Museum of Ancient Navigation.
- foundations of two other Greek temples: the first, very large, next to the crypts of the Mother Church; the second near the new multi-storey car park in via Istria.
- a monumental villa from the Hellenistic period on the Capo Soprano promontory with a view of the gulf

In 2019, a sarcophagus containing an intact skeleton was discovered at Gela. Some weeks later, a short distance away, a ceramic water jug containing the bones of a newborn baby and parts of a large animal's skeleton was discovered. Archaeologists said the place was certainly a Greek necropolis.

== Twin towns ==
Gela is twinned with:

- Eleusina, Greece
- Wittingen, Germany
- Nordkapp, Norway

== Sports ==
=== Football ===
Gela has got a football team; S.S.D. Città di Gela. Their football stadium is Stadio Vincenzo Presti. This team was founded in 1975 and re-founded in 2006, 2011 and 2019. Their best performance in Italian football was 12th position in the group B of the 2010–11 Lega Pro Prima Divisione.

== Notable people ==
- Gelo
- Aeschylus
- Archestratus
- Polyzalus

== See also ==
- Gela Calcio
- Gela railway station
- Magna Graecia
