= List of ancient Greek lawgivers =

The ancient Greek lawgivers listed alphabetically below include the mythological Aegimius and figures dated from about the 9th to the 3rd centuries BCE. They were associated with places including Athens, Sparta, Sicily, and Cyrenaica.

- Aegimius (mythological)
- Cercidas (fl. 3rd century BCE, Megalopolis)
- Charondas (fl. 6th century BCE, Catania in Sicily)
- Cleisthenes (c. 570 – c. 508 BCE, Athens)
- Demonax (fl. 6th century BCE, Cyrenaica)
- Diagoras of Melos (fl. 5th century BCE)
- Diocles of Syracuse (fl. 5th century BCE)
- Draco (fl. c. 625–600 BCE, Athens)
- Lycurgus (fl. c. 820 BCE, Sparta)
- Nicodorus of Mantineia (fl. 425 BCE)
- Solon (c. 630 – c. 560 BCE, Athens)
- Zaleucus (fl. 7th century BCE, Epizephyrian Locris)
