= Temple of Athena (Syracuse) =

Ancient Greek temple in Syracuse

Coordinates: 37.059604°N 15.293694°E

- Athenaion
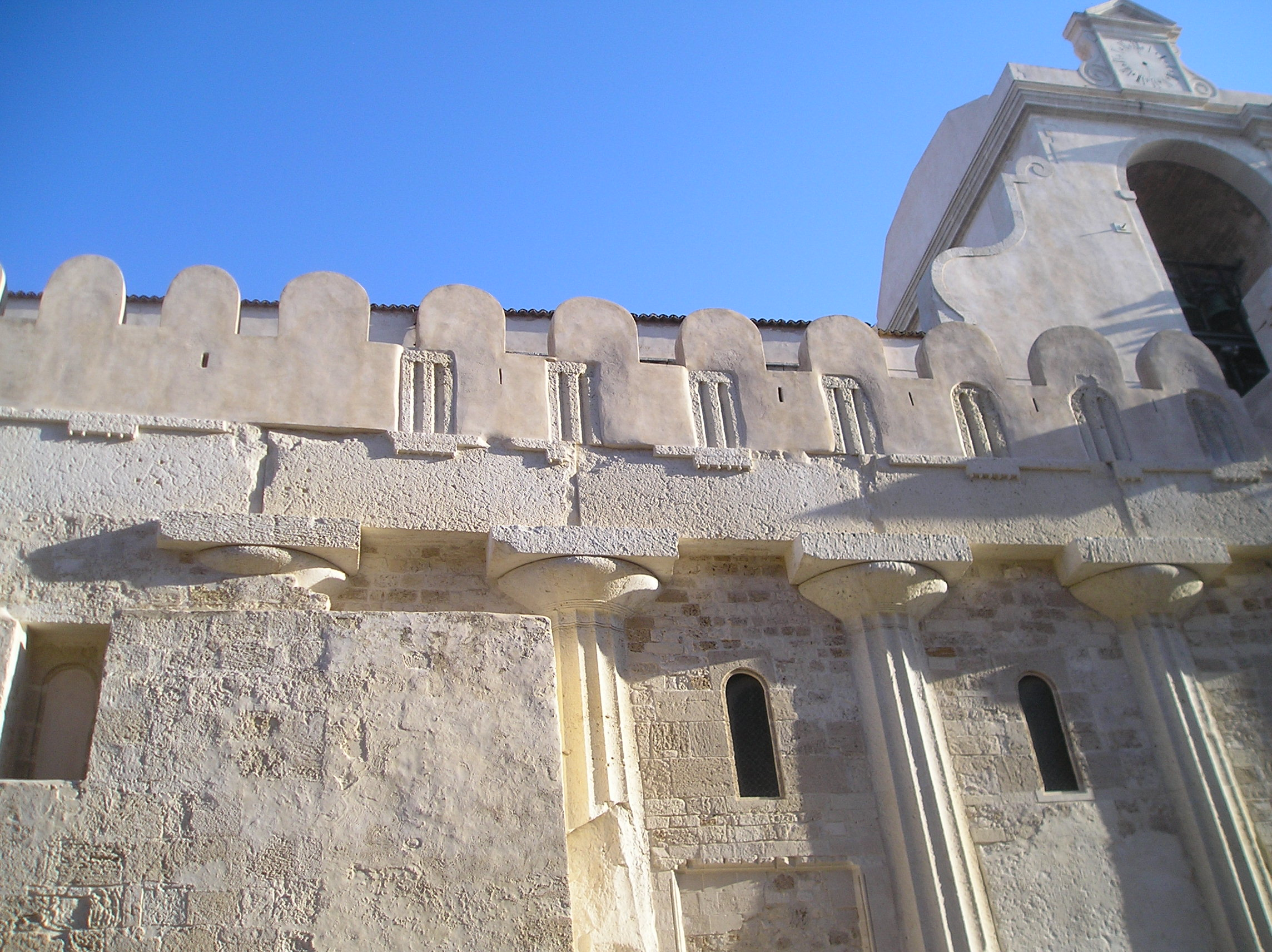
- Columns of the temple incorporated into the Duomo
- Interactive map of Temple of Athena
- Type: Temple
- Periods: 5th century BC
- Cultures: Siciliote-Greek
- Location: Syracuse, Italy

UNESCO World Heritage Site
- Type: Cultural
- Criteria: ii, iii
- Designated: 2005
- Part of: Syracuse and the Rocky Necropolis of Pantalica
- Reference no.: 1200
- Region: Europe and North America

The Temple of Athena is a hexastyle peripteral Doric temple built in Syracuse, Magna Graecia, in the 5th century BC by the tyrant Gelo after his victory over the Carthaginians at the Battle of Himera.

The temple was preceded by a cult site which dated back to the 8th century BC, with an altar discovered in excavation at the beginning of the twentieth century, and by an earlier temple from the middle of the sixth century BC.

== History ==
=== Gelo and the construction of the temple ===
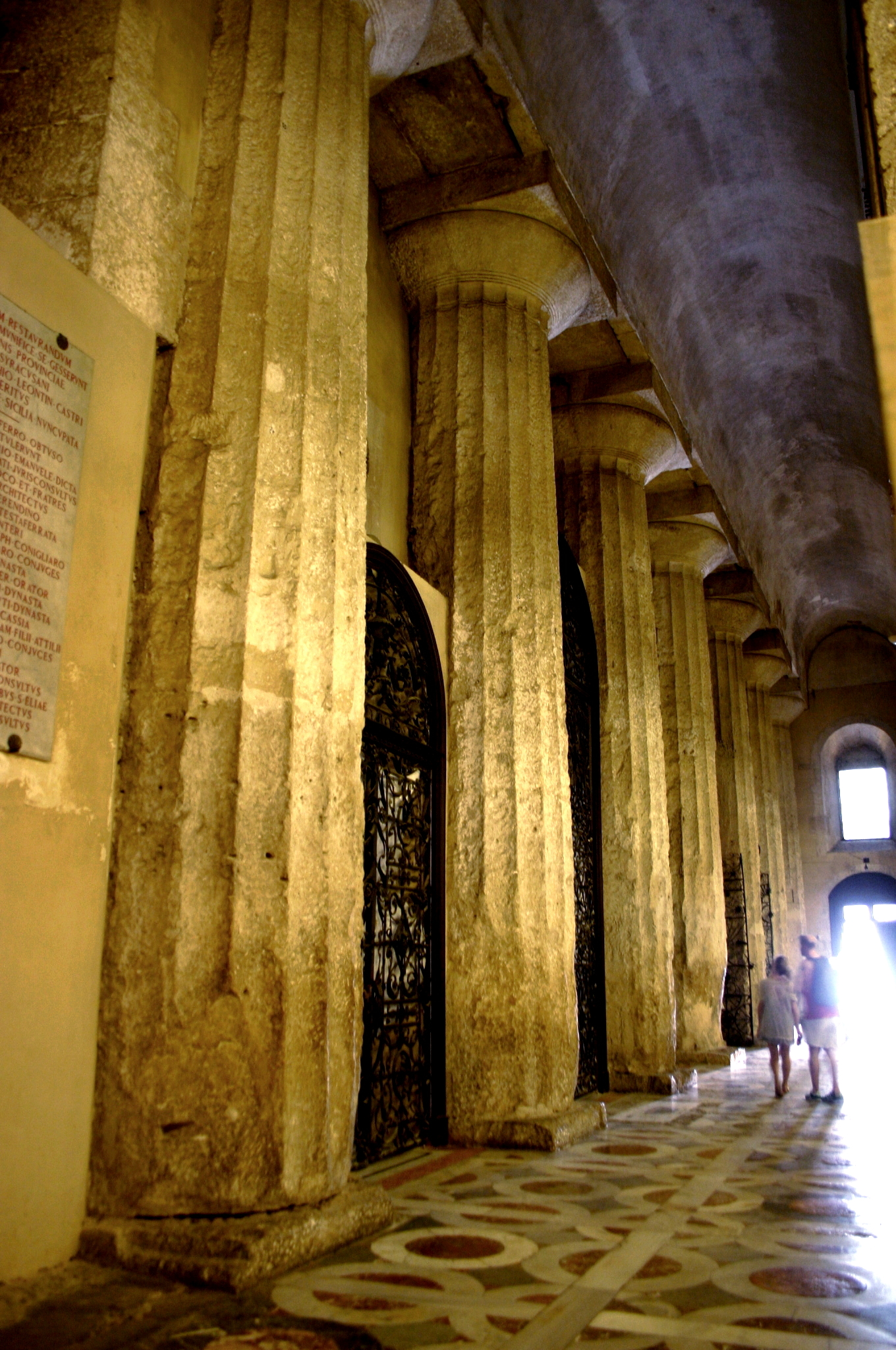
Columns of the temple within the Duomo

Right where the temple of Athena is located, there once was another, more archaic temple, still in the doric style, as archaeological discoveries during the excavations of 1912 and 1917 confirmed. They included architectural elements, terracottas and part of an altar, datable to the sixth century BC.

The Athenaion was built, according to the literary sources, by Gelo, the first tyrant of Syracuse, who came from the Deinomenid dynasty of Gela, after his victory over the Carthaginians at the Battle of Himera in 480 BC. The similarity of the Temple of Athena to the Temple of Victory at Himera has convinced archaeologists that both the date and circumstances of the temple's construction given in the literary sources are correct.

The temple was dedicated to Athena, goddess of wisdom and warfare, as testified by Cicero in his Verrine Orations and also by Plato and Athenaeus. Cicero provides extensive details in his speech, claiming that the temple had been respected by the conqueror of Syracuse, Marcus Claudius Marcellus and had only been plundered by the praetor Verres.

== Structure of the Temple ==
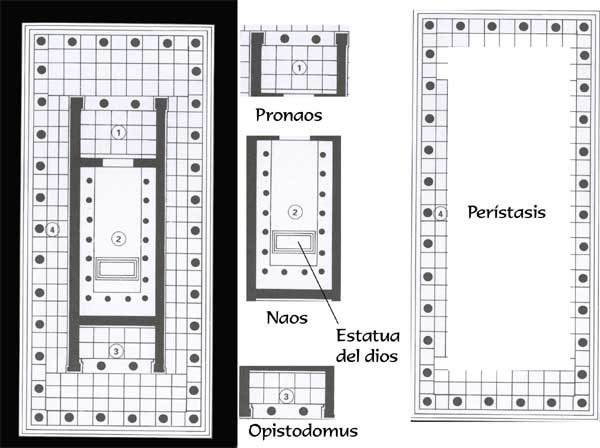
Plan of the Temple of Athena of Syracuse

The Athenaio was a peripteral temple with six columns on the short sides and fourteen on the long sides. On the front, the intercolumniation at either edge was reduced, the canonical solution to issues of perspective. In total, the building was 22 metres wide and 55 metres long. The peristyle surrounded a cella with a pronaos and an opisthodomos, both featuring two columns in antis.

The temple was converted into a Christian place of worship and parts of it are still found incorporated into the walls of the Cathedral of Syracuse. On the left side of the Duomo, some columns of local limestone and the stylobate on which they stood remain visible. Other remains (marble tiles and water spouts shaped like lion's heads) are preserved in the Museo Archeologico Regionale Paolo Orsi. Inside the Duomo, 9 further columns from the right side of the peripteros are clearly visible, with a pronounced entasis, as well as the two from the front of the cella.

== Architecture and pictorial decoration ==
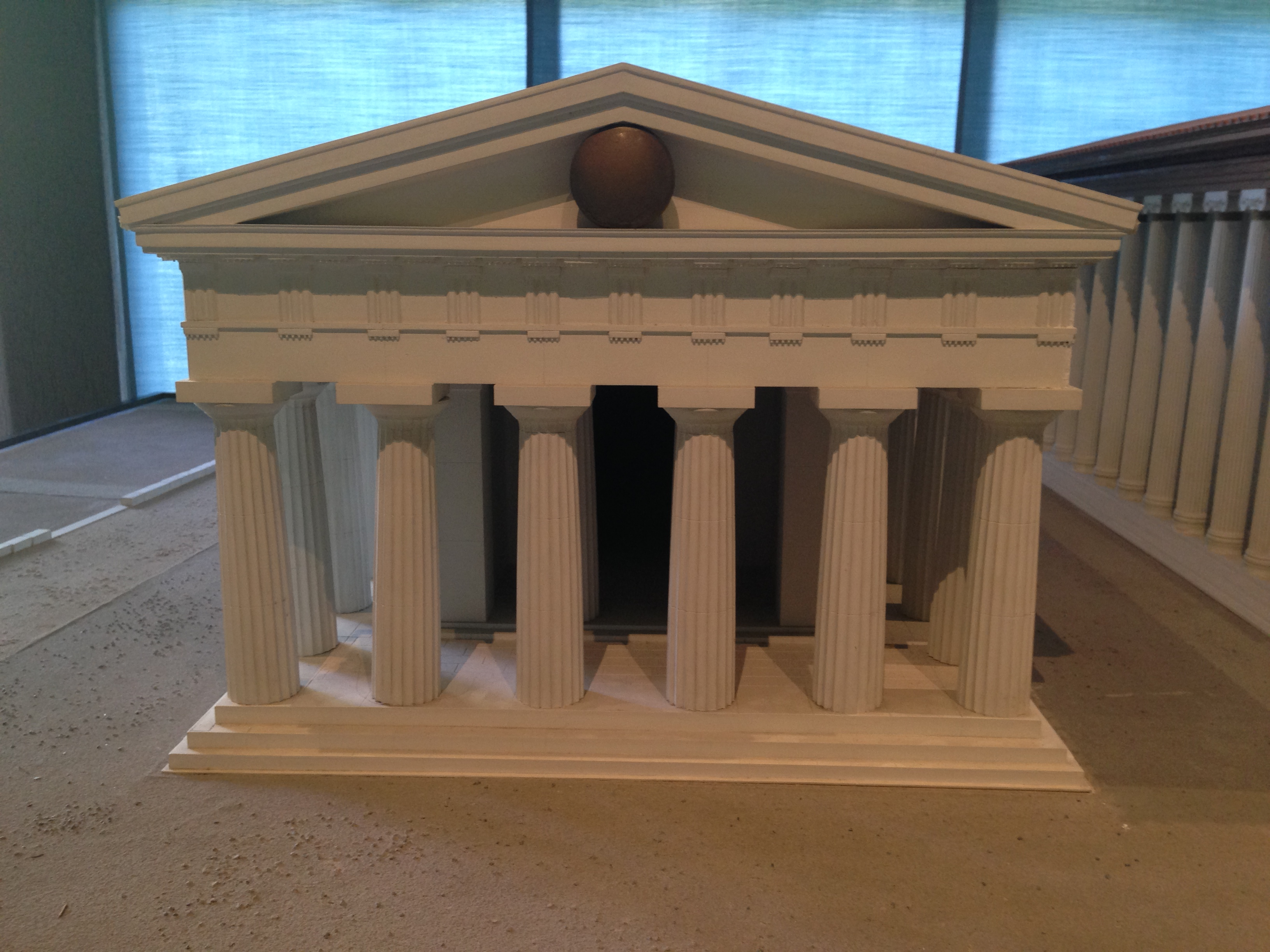
Reconstruction of the front of the Temple of Athena with the gilded shield

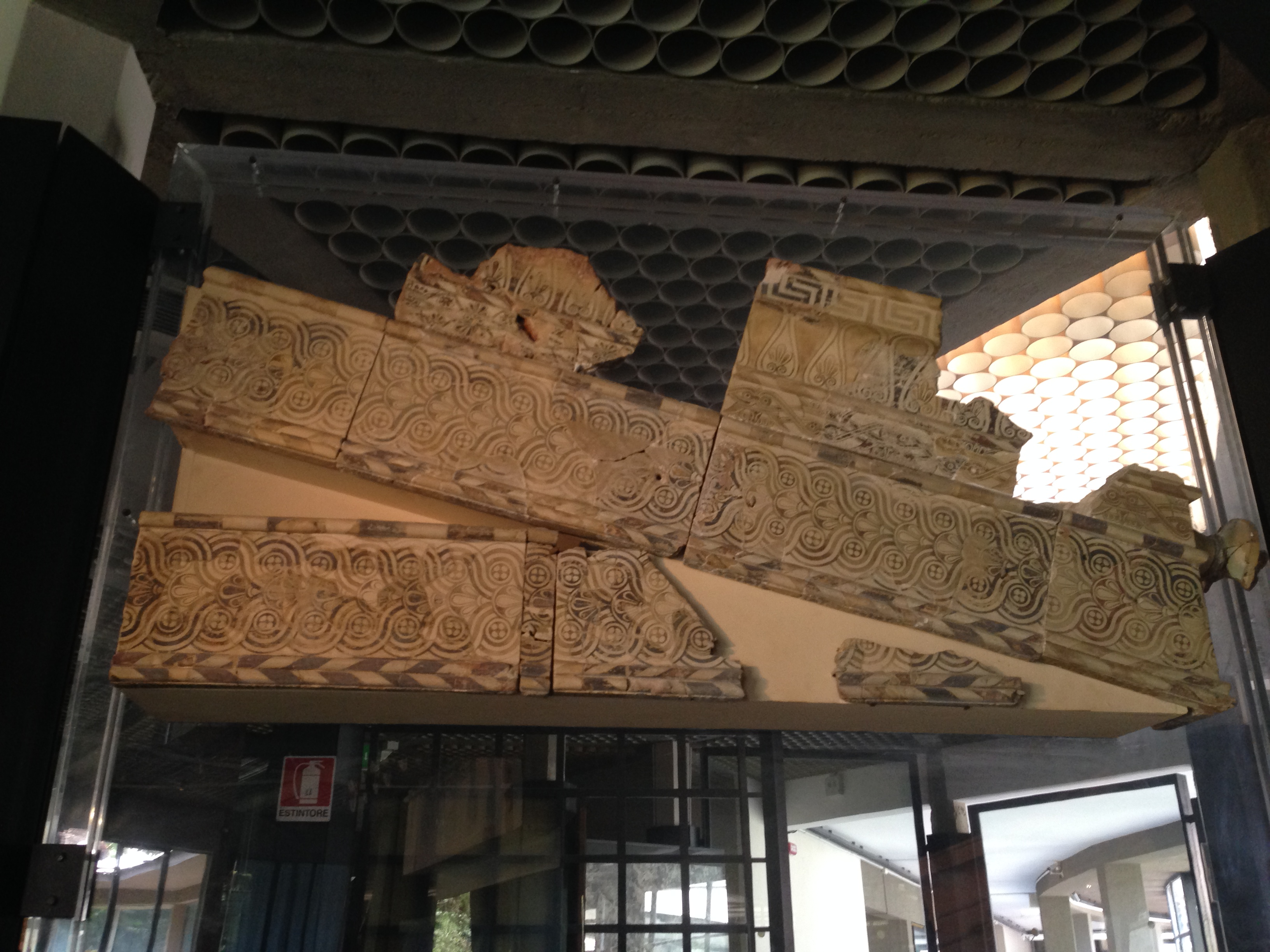
Part of the pediment of the Temple of Athena

It contained another temple too, consecrated to Minerva, which was very ornate and beautiful. In the pediment was the gilt copper shield of Minerva, which was so large that it was visible to sailors on the high seas. Those who left the port of Syracuse would lift a cup or a glass made of clay from near the altar of the goddess outside the walls near the temple of Zeus, when they were so distant that they could no longer see the shield, and they would fill it with apples, incense, spices and flowers and throw it all into the sea in honour of Neptune and Minerva. After performing this sacrifice, according to superstition, they continued happily on their journey.

— Tommaso Fazello, Storia di Sicilia, p.293

This is the description which Tommaso Fazello gave of the gilt shield located in the pediment of the Syracusan temple.

From Cicero, who lists the decorations pillaged by Verres, we know that it was decorated with ivory, golden bosses on the doors, and a series of painted panels depicting a cavalry battle between Agathokles and the Carthaginians, as well as 27 portraits of the city's tyrants.

== See also ==
- List of Ancient Greek temples
