= Termini Imerese =

Termini Imerese Tèrmini (Sicilian)
- Comune
- Città di Termini Imerese
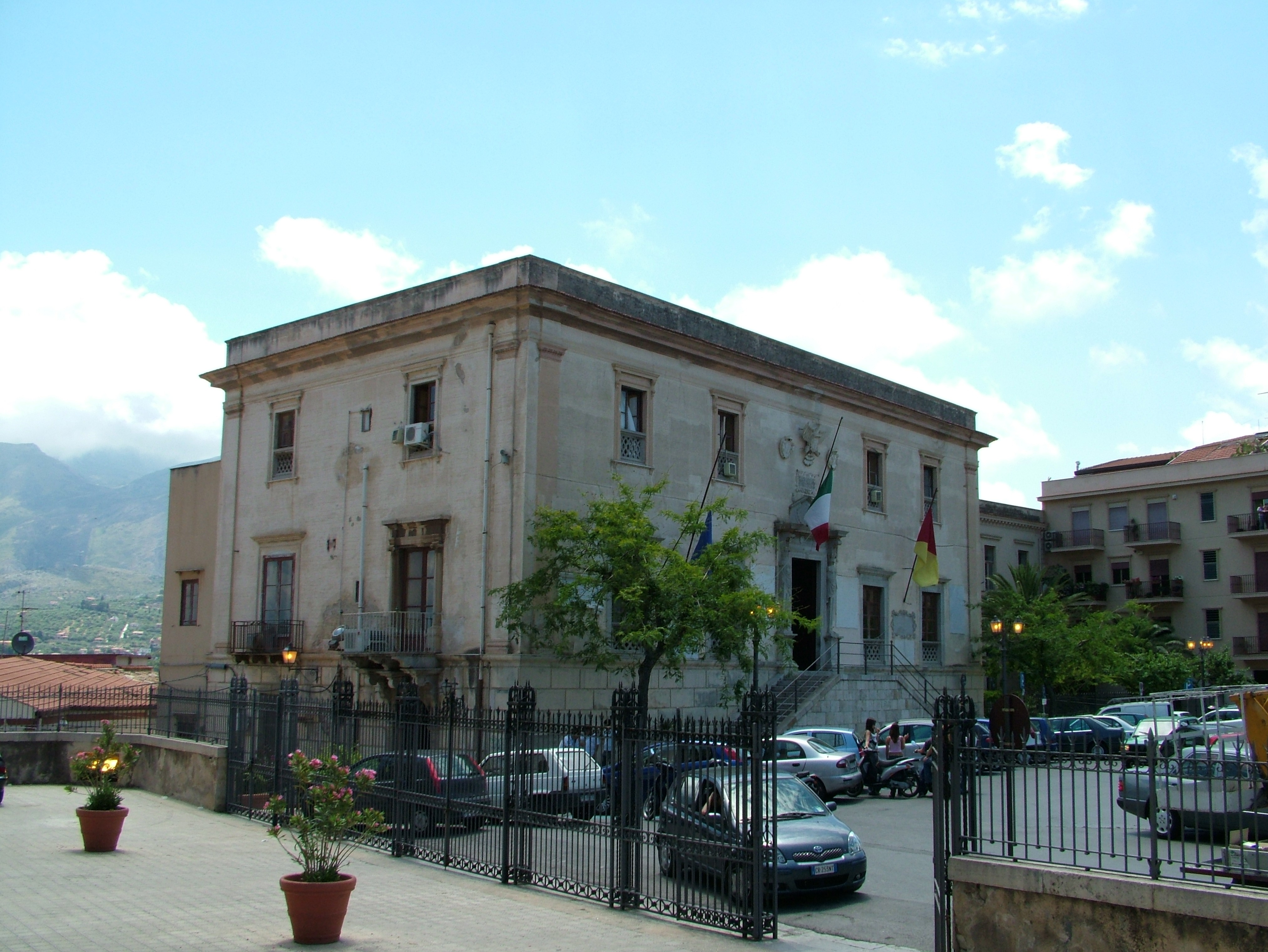

- Coat of arms

- Location within Italy Location within Sicily
- Coordinates: 37°59′14″N 13°41′46″E
- Country: Italy
- Region: Sicily
- Metropolitan city: Palermo (PA)

Government
  - Mayor: Maria Terranova

Area
  - Total: 77.57 km^{2} (29.95 sq mi)
- Elevation: 77 m (253 ft)

Population (2007)
  - Total: 27,435
  - Density: 353.7/km^{2} (916.0/sq mi)
- Demonym: Termitani / Tirminisi (Sicilian)
- Time zone: UTC+1 (CET)
  - Summer (DST): UTC+2 (CEST)
- Postal code: 90018
- Patron saint: Beato Agostino Novello
- Saint day: May 19
- Website: Official website

Termini Imerese (Italian pronunciation: [ˈtɛrmini imeˈreːze, -eːse]; Sicilian: Tèrmini [ˈtɛɾmɪnɪ]) (Note: Ancient Greek: Θέρμαι Thérmai, Ancient Greek: Θερμαὶ αἱ Ἱμερᾶαι Thermaì hai Himerâai (Pol.), Ancient Greek: Θερμαὶ Ἱμέραι Thermaì Himérai (Ptol.), or Ancient Greek: Θερμὰ (Ἱμεραῖα) Thermà (Himeraîa) (Diod.); Latin: Thermae Himerenses; literally "Himera's hot springs".) is a town of the Metropolitan City of Palermo on the northern coast of Sicily, in Italy. It is one of the most important towns of the Metropolitan City of Palermo, from which it is 33 km (20.51 mi) away. The town is easily reachable through its well developed infrastructures: there are three highway exits along the A19, its station is the meeting point between all of the Sicilian railway lines and its seaport links the town with other important maritime Italian cities. It has a judicial district. It is culturally interesting for the close Greek ruins of Himera, its numerous churches, Roman ruins, prehistorical finds and the annual celebration of the Carnival, one of the oldest in Italy. In the heart of the old town, at its lower level, there are the thermal baths of the Grand Hotel delle Terme, where precious hot waters have flowed since Roman age. In the areas of Termini and the near Sciara and Caccamo is the Oriented Nature Reserve of Mount St. Calogero, located between the coast of Termini Imerese Gulf and the surrounding fertile flat territory. In the east zone of the town, there is a large industrial area, especially known for the former factory which was owned by FIAT and for the ENEL power plant "Ettore Majorana".

== History ==
=== Ancient history ===
The site of the town has been populated since prehistoric times, as many archaeological excavations have shown through the years. Its documented history begins in 409 BC after the second Battle of Himera when its more ancient neighbour, Himera (now completely within the comune's borders), was completely destroyed by the Carthaginian army under Hannibal Mago. Those who survived the devastation moved to a site then called "Thermae" which is today known as Termini and became the successor to Himera. The new town of Thermae or Therma, called for the sake of distinction Thermae Himerenses, obviously derived its name from the hot springs for which it was celebrated, and the discovery of which was connected by legends with the wanderings of Hercules. It appears to have quickly become a considerable town, though it continued to be subject to Carthaginian rule.

In the First Punic War its name is repeatedly mentioned. In 260 BC, a body of Roman troops was encamped in the neighbourhood when they were attacked by Hamilcar and defeated with heavy loss.

==== Roman age ====
Before the close of the First Punic War (241 BC), Thermae was besieged and taken by the Romans but the city seems to have been treated with unusual favour by its conquerors. Cicero tells us that the Romans allowed the Thermitani to govern their city and territory with their own laws as a reward for their steady fidelity. As they were on hostile terms with Rome during the First Punic War, it can only be to the subsequent period that this "fidelity" applies.

In the time of Cicero (80-40 BC), Thermae appears to have been a flourishing place, carrying on a considerable amount of trade, though he speaks of it as oppidum non maximum. He attested the magnificence of the ancient city and the taste of its citizens for the encouragement of art, calling it in primis Siciliae clarum et ornatum as statues were preserved by the Thermitani to whom they had been restored by Scipio after the conquest of Carthage.

It seems to have become a colony in the time of Augustus (27 BC – 14 AD), whence we find mention in inscriptions of the Ordo et Populus splendidissimae Coloniae Augustae Himeraeorum Thermitanorum. Thermae colonia is mentioned by Pliny and must refer to this town, though he seems to confuse it with Thermae Selinuntiae (modern Sciacca) on the south coast which was not a colony.

There are few subsequent accounts of Thermae; but, as its name is found in Ptolemy and the Itineraries, and from the impressive aqueduct and some other remains it appears to have continued in existence throughout the period of the Roman Empire, and probably never ceased to be inhabited, as the modern town of Termini Imerese retains the ancient site as well as name.

=== Medieval and industrial era ===
Following the fall of the Roman Empire, the city entered a period of decline. Termini continued to exist as a bishopric until the 12th century, though the list of bishops contains various gaps and uncertainties. Under Norman rule, the city was at first a royal city; it subsequently became one of 42 città demaniali, cities administered directly by the crown rather than local nobility. Above all, from the Middle Ages through the beginning of the 19th century, Termini served as a major centre for the collection and shipping of grain and other foodstuffs stored and subjected to duty in a special government warehouse complex (the caricatore regio). The presence of the caricatore improved the fortunes of the city, turning it into one of the major ports of Sicily and strengthening its commercial relationships with the maritime republics of Genoa, Pisa and Venice as well as the major Mediterranean ports (Marseille, Barcelona, etc.) and, during the 16th century, those of the Atlantic.

Towards the end of the 18th century, Termini became the site of the Ereina Imerese branch of the Ereina di Palermo academy, followed soon thereafter by the establishment of the Accademia Euracea, later the Accademia Mediterranea Euracea.

In the 19th century, however, the closing of the caricatore precipitated a profound economic crisis that lasted until the end of the 20th century, when artisanal and proto-industrial activity began to replace the traditional agricultural base of the city's economy. A period of population decline, linked primarily to emigration to the Americas, was balanced at the beginning of the 20th century by immigration from Agrigento, Messina and Ragusa.

=== Modern era ===
Between 1970 and 2011, Termini was home to a large Fiat automobile manufacturing facility, where small cars such as the 126, the original Panda, and the Punto have been manufactured. The plant was the sole assembly site for the second generation Lancia Ypsilon built between 2005 and 2011. In 2006 the plant celebrated its four millionth car produced. At the end of 2011, Fiat sold the plant to Chinese car manufacturer Chery. From January 2015, it was owned by Blutec, until its owner was arrested by the Guardia di Finanza in 2020. The plant was subsequently put up for sale again in 2023.

There is also a power station operated by Enel with a generation capacity of 454 MW.

== Main sights ==
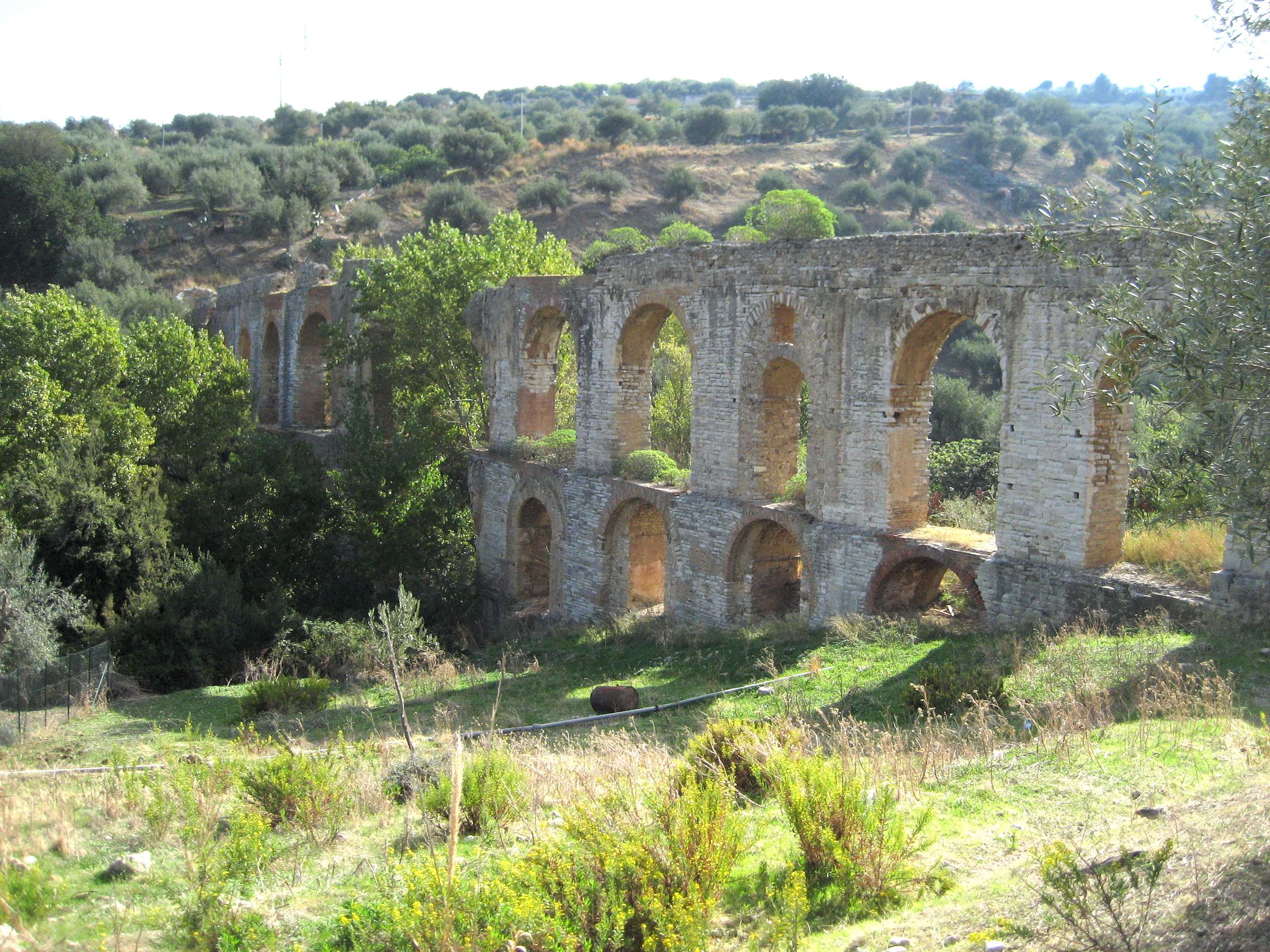
Roman aqueduct

- Roman aqueduct bridge with two tiers of arches and other parts of the aqueduct of Cornelius
- Roman amphitheatre probably from the Augustan age built into houses between Via Garibaldi and Via San Marco. It has a double ambulatory, a remarkable for such a small building (around 98 x 75 m). The cavea was partly excavated and partly built up: a part of the lower order of the arches remains visible high on the western part (in via Anfiteatro).
- Temple of Victory at Himera
- Cathedral of St. Nicholas of Bari (1604). It houses a statue by Giorgio da Milano (1487) and several works by Ignazio Marabitti.
- Church of St. Catherine of Alexandria (1?th-16th centuries). It is home to a series of frescoes depicting the life of the namesake saint.
- Church of Santa Maria di Gesù (late 15th century). Works inside include a sculpture attributed to Giorgio da Milano and a high-relief by Domenico Gagini (c. 1480)

=== Aqueduct ===
The Roman aqueduct bridge is the largest and best preserved of the island.

The source was located 5 km east of the city, at the foot of Monte San Calogero where the remains of the two settling tanks can still be seen in the locality of Brucato.

The aqueduct needed to cross the Barratina stream and the earliest the crossing was made at Fontana Superiore with a siphon about 600 m long, of which the well preserved hexagonal compression tower remains, 16 m high and resting on a square plinth of 6 m sides. On five of the sides were windows and from the east side the conduit started. On this tower was once a large inscription, now disappeared: aquae Cornealiae ductus p. XX. The last letters ("twenty feet") perhaps corresponds to the sides of the building.

Later it seems that the aqueduct passed further downstream: in Figurella a double-order bridge of arches is still visible (originally nine in the lower, fifteen in the upper: two arches for each order collapsed), 14 m high. The structure with facing blocks is the same as that of the amphitheatre and the curia and shows that it belongs to the same building project of the Augustan colony.

== Sports ==
Founded in 1996, Libertas Termini was a professional women's basketball team, until it was dissolved in 2003. It was then succeeded by Basket Himera that same year but was also eventually liquidated by 2010.

A.C.D Termitana 1952 is the local football playing in the local Sicilian leagues, dating back to 1931 although it has undergone multiple mergers, name changes and re-foundations since.

== Sister cities ==
- Elk Grove Village, IL, United States, since 2002
- La Valletta, Malta, since 2014
- Zihuatanejo, Mexico, since 2014
- Vilnius, Lithuania, since 2014
- Maranello, Italy, since 2016
