= Temple of Victory (Himera) =

Ancient Greek temple

Coordinates: 37°58′26″N 13°49′26″E

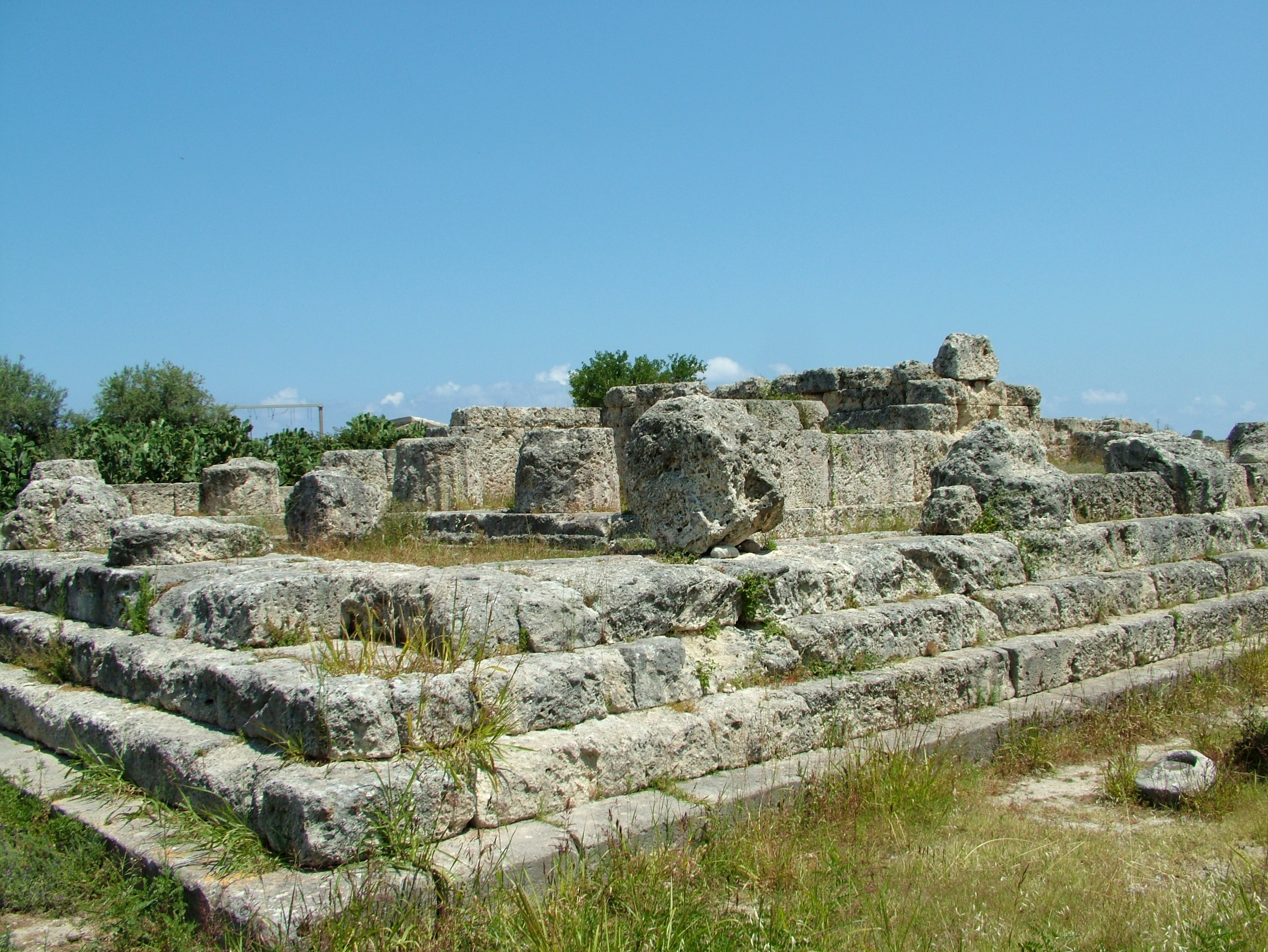
The Temple of Nike at Himera.

The Temple of Victory (Greek Nikē) is a Greek temple of the ancient city of Himera in Magna Graecia located in the archaeological area of Termini Imerese, in the Metropolitan City of Palermo in Sicily, southern Italy.

== Description ==
The temple dates to between 480 and 470 BC and has been identified with the temple built at the order of the tyrant Gelon of Syracuse who commanded the Greek coalition which defeated a Carthaginian invasion force at the Battle of Himera in 480 BC.

Probably dedicated to Athena, the building was burnt and destroyed, most likely in 409 BC when the Carthaginians captured the city of Himera.

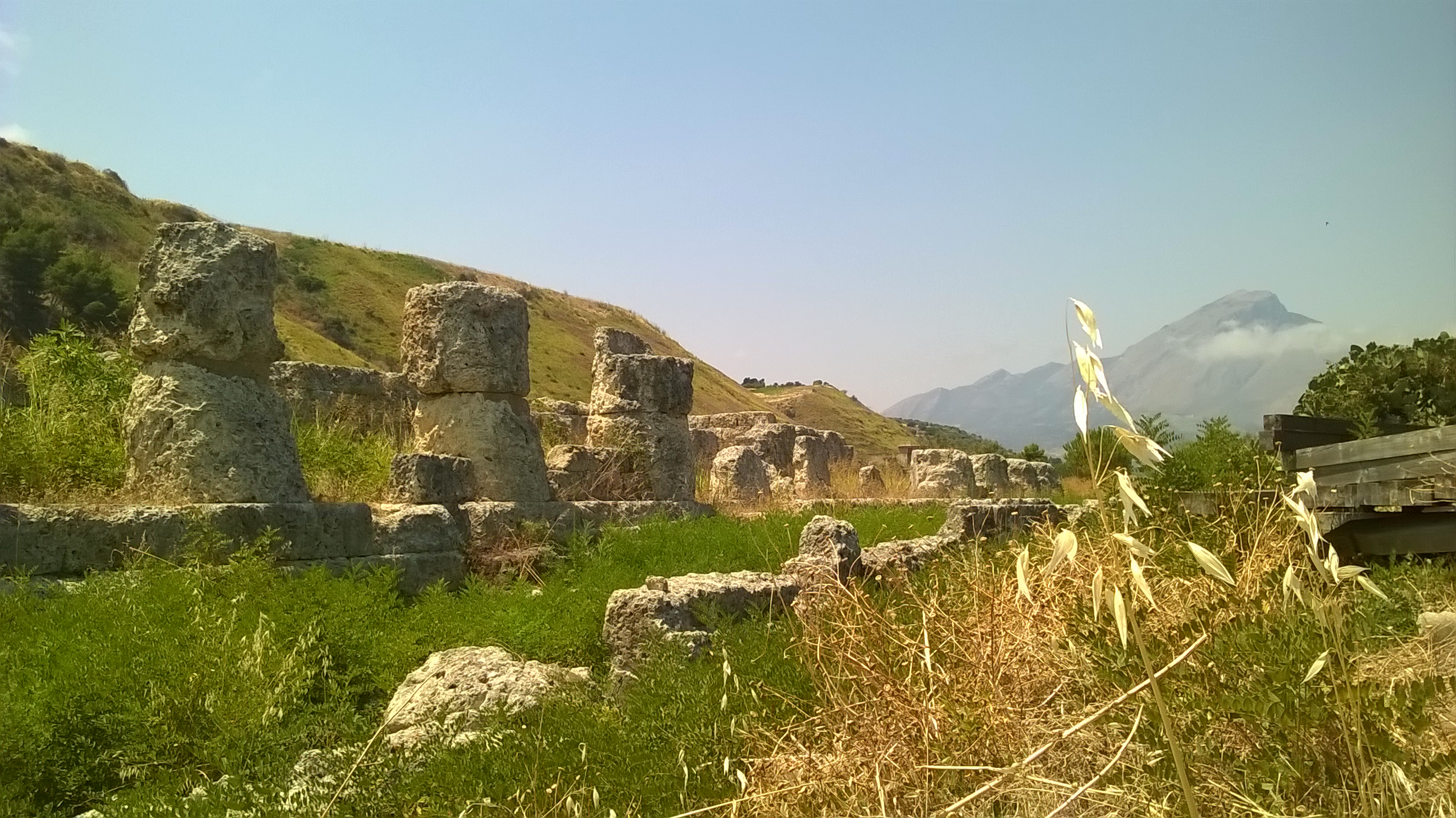
Temple of Victory

== See also ==
- List of Ancient Greek temples

== Sources ==
- Stefano Vassallo. Himera città greca. Guida alla storia e ai monumenti. Dipartimento dei Beni Culturali, Ambientali e dell'Educazione Permanente, Palermo: 2005.
