= Diocles of Syracuse =

5th-century BC Syracusan politician and military leader

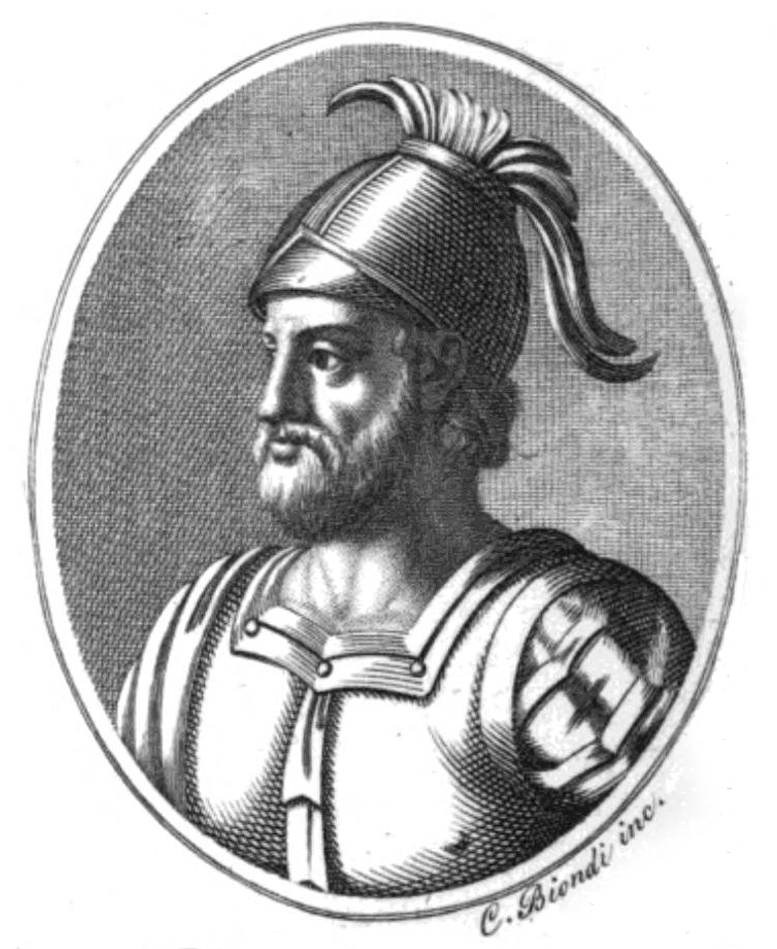
Portrait of Diocle made in 1821

Diocles of Syracuse (Greek: Διοκλῆς) was a legislator, orator, and political and military leader in the Greek city-state of Syracuse, Magna Graecia, toward the end of the 5th century BC. Only a few years of his life have an historical account, from 413 to 408 BC.

== Orator ==
The historian Diodorus Siculus presents Diocles as a famous and respected orator, when he proposed, on the day following the victory over the Athenians in 413 BC, a punishment of the greatest severity against the vanquished: execution of Demosthenes and Nicias, the two Athenian generals, condemnation to slavery in the stone quarries for the Athenian soldiers, and the fate of being sold into slavery for the soldiers of the allies of Athens. Reinforced by the speech of Gylippus, that emphasized that a fate so cruel was intended for the Syracusans in case of Athenian victory, the suggestion was adopted against the opinion of those favoring clemency backed by the strategist Hermocrates. (According to Plutarch and Thucydides, Gylippus wanted to take the two Athenian generals back to Sparta as proof of his own military success.)

== Democratic legislator ==
After the victory of 413 BC, the Syracusans that actively participated in the defense of the city were in a position to demand democratic reforms, following the example of the favor given to political democracy in Athens following the Battle of Salamis that was won by an Athenian navy principally composed from the common people.

Diocles first put into practice two measures:

- The term limit for the exit of the magistrates
  This limitation by designation method, already practiced to Athens, is for Aristotle a characteristic of the democracies.
  The nomination of a group of experts in charge of composing laws
  Then, having been named in this group of experts, Diocles there takes a preponderant role, so well that the laws created carry his name. The justice and accuracy of his system of penalties and of rewards won him the admiration of its fellow countrymen, and beyond the city-state of Syracuse, with numerous Greek cities of Sicily that adopted and preserved the laws down to the time of the domination of Roman laws.

=== Legal changes ===
In 412 BC, a committee, led by Diocles, erected a law which (among other things) forbade the people to bear weapons in the agora under pain of the death penalty. This law was met with popularity, as it began to be adopted outside of Syracuse in many other city-states in Sicily.

== Military leader in failure ==
In 410 BC, Hermocrates was forced into exile and historians believe this event gave Diocles undisputed control of Syracuse. In 409 BC, Diocles was named at the head of an army of 4000 armed men to bring relief to Himera, which was being besieged by the Carthaginians led by Hannibal Mago, who had landed in Sicily with Iberian troops and won a first victory at the Battle of Selinus. The Syracusan expedition was a failure: after the first battle at Himera, the Syracusan army was forced to turn back in fear of a Carthaginian attack against Syracuse. Himera then fell and was razed, leaving to the Syracusans the only consolation of rescuing some Himeran women and children who fled with the Syracusan army. In 408 BC, some time after the Battle of Himera, Hermocrates returned to Sicily and had some military successes against the Carthaginians, turning Syracusan public opinion against Diocles. It is known that Diocles himself was forced into exile in 408 BC and seems to vanish from the historical record. It is believed that he died shortly afterwards, and there is a legend about his death, similar to those surrounding the deaths of Zaleucus and Charondas.
