= Port of Termini Imerese =

Port in Italy

- Interactive map of Port of Termini Imerese
- Location in Sicily

Location
- Country: Italy
- Location: Termini Imerese
- Coordinates: 37°59′10″N 13°42′15″E

Details
- Owned by: Port Authority of Western Sicily
- Type of harbour: Natural/Artificial

Statistics
- Vessel arrivals: 940 vessels (2018)
- Annual cargo tonnage: 1,188,199 tonnes (2018)
- Passenger traffic: 53,106 (2018)
- Website www.adsppalermo.it

Port of Termini Imerese (Italian: Porto di Termini Imerese) is a harbor located in Termini Imerese, Sicily, Italy. The port, that operates mostly in cargo shipping, is relatively close and integrated with that of Palermo (it's owned by the same Port Authority of Western Sicily).
