= Himera =

Ancient city

- Ἱμέρα (Ancient Greek)
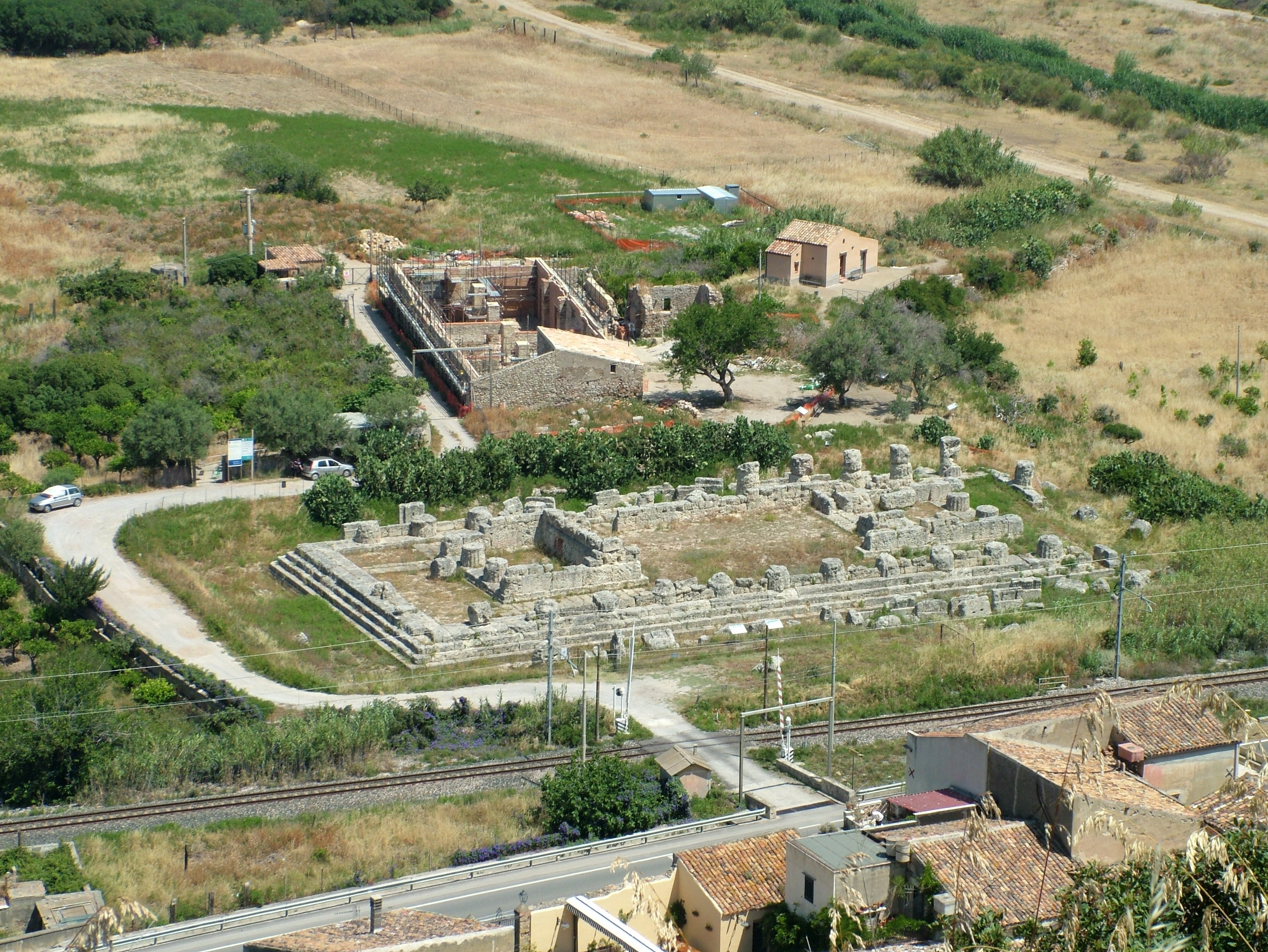
- Remains of the Temple of Victory at Himera

- Location within Italy
- 37°58′26.39″N 13°49′26.35″E
- Type: Settlement
- Location: Buonfornello, Province of Palermo, Sicily, Italy

History
- Events: Battle of Himera (480 BC); Battle of Himera (409 BC)

Site notes
- Management: Soprintendenza BB.CC.AA. di Palermo
- Public access: Yes
- Website: Area Archeologica e Antiquarium di Himera (in Italian)

Himera (Greek: Ἱμέρα), was a large and important ancient Greek city situated on the north coast of Sicily at the mouth of the river of the same name (the modern Imera Settentrionale), between Panormus (modern Palermo) and Cephaloedium (modern Cefalù) in the comune of Termini Imerese.

Many of its remains can be visited and there are two museums on the site.

== History ==
=== Foundation and earliest history ===
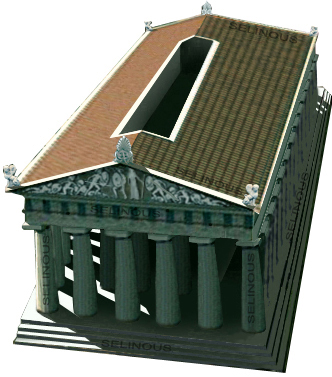
Ideal reconstruction of the Temple of Victory.

Himera was the first Greek settlement on this part of the island and was a strategic outpost just outside the eastern boundary of the Carthaginian-controlled west. Thucydides says it was the only Greek city on this coast of Sicily, which must however be understood with reference only to independent cities. Mylae, which was also on the north coast and certainly of Greek origin, was a dependency of Zancle (modern Messina). All authorities agree that Himera was a colony of Zancle, but Thucydides tells us that the emigrants from Zancle mingled with a number of Syracusan exiles, resulting in a city with Chalcidian institutions and a Doric dialect.

The foundation of Himera is placed subsequent to that of Mylae (as, from their relative positions, might naturally have been expected) both by Strabo and Scymnus of Chios: its date is not mentioned by Thucydides, but Diodorus tells us that it had existed 240 years at the time of its destruction by the Carthaginians, which would fix its first settlement in 648 BC.

Archaeology shows that around 580-560 BC the city was completely rebuilt after an unknown event destroyed it. There is otherwise very little information as to its early history: an obscure notice in Aristotle, from which it appears to have at one time fallen under the dominion of the tyrant Phalaris, being the only mention found of it, until about 490 BC, when it afforded a temporary refuge to Scythes, tyrant of Zancle, after his expulsion from the latter city. Not long after this event, Himera fell itself under the yoke of a despot named Terillus, who sought to fortify his power by contracting a close alliance with Anaxilas, at that time ruler both of Rhegium (modern Reggio di Calabria) and Zancle. But Terillus was unable to resist the power of Theron, despot of Agrigentum (modern Agrigento), and, being expelled by him from Himera, had recourse to the assistance of the Carthaginians, a circumstance which became the immediate occasion of the first great expedition of that people to Sicily, 480 BC.

=== First interaction with Carthage ===
Site of the first battle of Himera

The magnitude of the armament sent under Hamilcar, who is said to have landed in Sicily with an army of 300,000 men, sufficiently proves that the conquest of Himera was the pretext, rather than the object, of the war. However, it is likely that the growing power of Himeria in the immediate vicinity of the Carthaginian settlements of Panormus and Solus had already caused concern among the Carthaginians. Hence it was against Himera that the first efforts of Hamilcar were directed. Theron, who had thrown himself into the city with all the forces at his command, was able to maintain its defence until the arrival of Gelon of Syracuse. Despite the numerical inferiority of his forces, he defeated the army of the Carthaginians with such slaughter that the Battle of Himera in 480 BC was regarded by the Greeks of Sicily as worthy of comparison with the contemporary victory of Salamis. The same feeling probably gave rise to the tradition or belief, that both triumphs were achieved on the very same day.

=== After the Battle of Himera ===
This victory left Theron in the undisputed possession of the sovereignty of Himera, as well as of that of Agrigentum. He appears to have focused on Agrigentum, and left the government of Himera to his son Thrasydaeus. But the young man, by his violent and oppressive rule, soon alienated the minds of the citizens. They applied for relief to Hieron of Syracuse, at that time on terms of hostility with Theron. The Syracusan despot, however, betrayed their overtures to Theron. He took vengeance on the Himeraeans, putting to death a large number of the disaffected citizens and driving others into exile. Shortly after, seeing that the city had suffered greatly from these severities and that its population was much diminished, he sought to restore its prosperity by establishing there a new body of citizens whom he collected from various quarters. The greater part of these new colonists were of Dorian extraction, and though the two bodies of citizens were blended into one and continued to live harmoniously together, at this period Himera became a Doric city. Himera adopted the institutions and followed the policy of the other Doric states of Sicily. This settlement seems to have taken place in 476 BC, and Himera continued subject to Theron until his death, in 472 BC, but Thrasydaeus retained possession of the sovereignty for a very short time after the death of his father, and his defeat by Hieron of Syracuse was speedily followed by his expulsion both from Agrigentum and Himera. In 466 BC we find the Himeraeans, in their turn, sending a force to assist the Syracusans in throwing off the yoke of Thrasybulus; and, in the general settlement of affairs which followed soon after, the exiles were allowed to return to Himera, where they appear to have settled quietly together with the new citizens. From this period Diodorus expressly tells us that Himera was fortunate enough to escape from civil dissensions, and this good government must have secured to it no small share of the prosperity which was enjoyed by the Sicilian cities in general during the succeeding half-century.

But though we are told in general terms that the period which elapsed from this re-settlement of Himera until its destruction by the Carthaginians (461–408 BC), was one of peace and prosperity, the only notices we find of the city during this interval refer to the part it took at the time of the Athenian expedition to Sicily, 415 BC. On that occasion, the Himeraeans were among the first to promise their support to Syracuse: hence, when Nicias presented himself before their port with the Athenian fleet, they altogether refused to receive him; and, shortly after, it was at Himera that Gylippus landed, and from whence he marched across the island to Syracuse, at the head of a force composed in great part of Himeraean citizens.

=== Destruction by Carthage ===
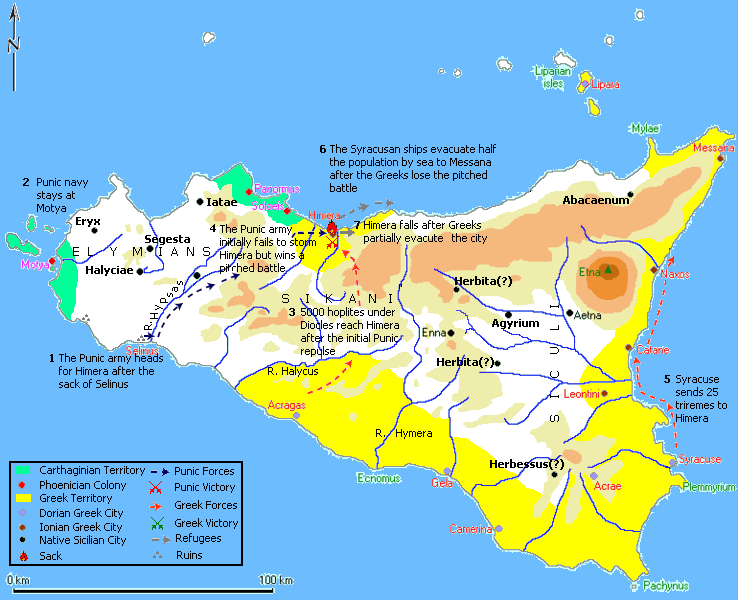
Sicily in 409 BC.

In 409 BC the prosperity of the city was brought to an abrupt end by the great Carthaginian expedition to Sicily. The ostensible object of the expedition was the support of the Segestans against their neighbours, the Selinuntines. The Carthaginians, though, had greater ambitions. Immediately after the destruction of Selinus, Hannibal Mago, who commanded the expedition, hastened to turn his arms against Himera. That city was ill-prepared for defence; its fortifications were of little strength, but the citizens made a desperate resistance, and by a vigorous sally inflicted severe loss on the Carthaginians. They were at first supported by a force of about 4000 auxiliaries from Syracuse under the command of Diocles, but that general feared for the safety of Syracuse itself and abandoned Himera, leaving the unfortunate citizens to contend singlehanded against the Carthaginian power. Their defenses failed and the city was soon taken by storm. A large part of the citizens were killed and at least 3000 of them, who had been taken prisoners, were put to death by Hannibal as a sacrifice to the memory of his grandfather Hamilcar. The city itself was utterly destroyed, its buildings razed to the ground, and even the temples themselves were not spared.

Diodorus, who relates the total destruction of Himera, tells us expressly that it was never rebuilt, and that the site remained uninhabited down to his own times. It seems at first in contradiction with this statement, that he elsewhere includes the Himeraeans, as well as the Selinuntines and Agrigentines, among the exiled citizens that were allowed by the treaty, concluded with Carthage, in 405 BC, to return to their homes, and inhabit their own cities, on condition of paying tribute to Carthage and not restoring their fortifications. And it seems clear that many of them at least availed themselves of this permission, as we find the Himeraeans subsequently mentioned among the states that declared in favour of Dionysius I of Syracuse, at the commencement of his great war with Carthage in 397 BC; though they quickly returned to the Carthaginian alliance in the following year. The explanation of this difficulty is furnished by Cicero, who tells us that, after the destruction of Himera, those citizens who had survived the calamity of the war established themselves at Thermae, within the confines of the same territory, and not far from their old town. Diodorus gives a somewhat different account of the foundation of Thermae, which he represents as established by the Carthaginians themselves before the close of the war, in 407 BC. But it is probable that both statements are substantially correct, and that the Carthaginians founded the new town in the immediate neighbourhood of Himera, in order to prevent the old site being again occupied; while the Himeraean exiles, when they returned thither, though they settled in the new town, naturally regarded themselves as still the same people, and would continue to bear the name of Himeraeans. How completely, even at a much later period, the one city was regarded as the representative of the other, appears from the statement of Cicero, that when Scipio Aemilianus, after the capture of Carthage, restored to the Agrigentines and Gelenses the statues that had been carried off from their respective cities, he at the same time restored to the citizens of Thermae those that had been taken from Himera. Hence we cannot be surprised to find that, not only are the Himeraeans still spoken of as an existing people, but even that the name of Himera itself is sometimes inadvertently used as that of their city. Thus, in 314 BC, Diodorus tells us that, by the treaty between Agathocles and the Carthaginians, it was stipulated that Heracleia, Selinus and Himera should continue subject to Carthage as they had been before. It is much more strange that we find the name of Himera reappear both in Mela and Pliny, though we know from the distinct statements of Cicero and Strabo, as well as Diodorus, that it had ceased to exist centuries before.

=== Foundation of Thermae ===
The new town of Thermae or Therma called for the sake of distinction Thermae Himerenses, which thus took the place of Himera, obviously derived its name from the hot springs for which it was celebrated, and the first discovery of which was connected by legends with the wanderings of Hercules. It appears to have early become a considerable town, though it continued, with few and brief exceptions, to be subject to the Carthaginian rule. In the First Punic War its name is repeatedly mentioned. Thus, in 260 BC, a body of Roman troops were encamped in the neighborhood, when they were attacked by Hamilcar, and defeated with heavy loss. Before the close of the war, Thermae itself was besieged and taken by the Romans. Cicero relates that the Roman government restored to the Thermitani their city and territory, with the free use of their own laws, as a reward for their steady fidelity. They were on hostile terms with Rome during the First Punic War, so it can only be to the subsequent period that these expressions apply; but the occasion to which they refer is unknown. In the time of Cicero, Thermae appears to have been a flourishing place, carrying on a considerable amount of trade, though the orator speaks, of it as oppidum non maximum. It seems to have received a colony in the time of Augustus, whence we find mention in inscriptions of the Ordo et Populus splendidissimae Coloniae Augustae Himeraeorum Thermitanorum: and there can be little doubt that the Thermae colonia of Pliny in reality refers to this town, though he evidently understood it to be Thermae Selinuntiae (modern Sciacca), as he places it on the south coast between Agrigentum and Selinus. There is little subsequent account of Thermae; but, as its name is found in Ptolemy and the Itineraries, it appears to have continued in existence throughout the period of the Roman Empire, and probably never ceased to be inhabited, as the modern town of Termini Imerese retains the ancient site as well as name. The magnificence of the ancient city, and the taste of its citizens for the encouragement of art, are attested by Cicero, who calls it in primis Siciliae clarum et ornatum; and some evidence of it remained, even in the days of that orator, in the statues preserved by the Thermitani, to whom they had been restored by Scipio, after the conquest of Carthage; and which were valuable, not only as relics of the past, but from their high merit as works of art. The numerous examples of coins from Himera testify to the city's wealth in antiquity.

== Site ==
The exact position of Himera was a subject of controversy until recent times. Cluverius was followed by almost all writers in the 19th century and placed it on the west bank of the river San Leonardo which flows past the west side of Termini. On this supposition the inhabitants moved from one bank of the river to the other which would explain the texts in which Himera and Thermae appear to be regarded as identical, and where the river Himera is also said to be flowing past Thermae.

Fazello correctly identified the Himera river with the Imera Settentrionale, the mouth of which is 8 miles from Termini. This distance was not too great to be reconciled with Cicero's expression that the new settlement (Thermae) was established non longe ab oppido antique; while the addition that it was in the same territory would seem to imply that it was not very near the old site.

== Archaeology ==
Many parts of the ancient city have been excavated in recent years and can be visited. Of the lower city the main visible remains consist of the monumental Tempio della Vittoria (Temple of Victory), a Doric structure built to commemorate the defeat of the Carthaginians.

The upper city on top of the hill has remains of other temples and of many other buildings.

At various locations around the city were the town's necropoles and many artifacts recovered are displayed in both museums on site.

There are also impressive displays in Palermo's Museo Archeologico Regionale.

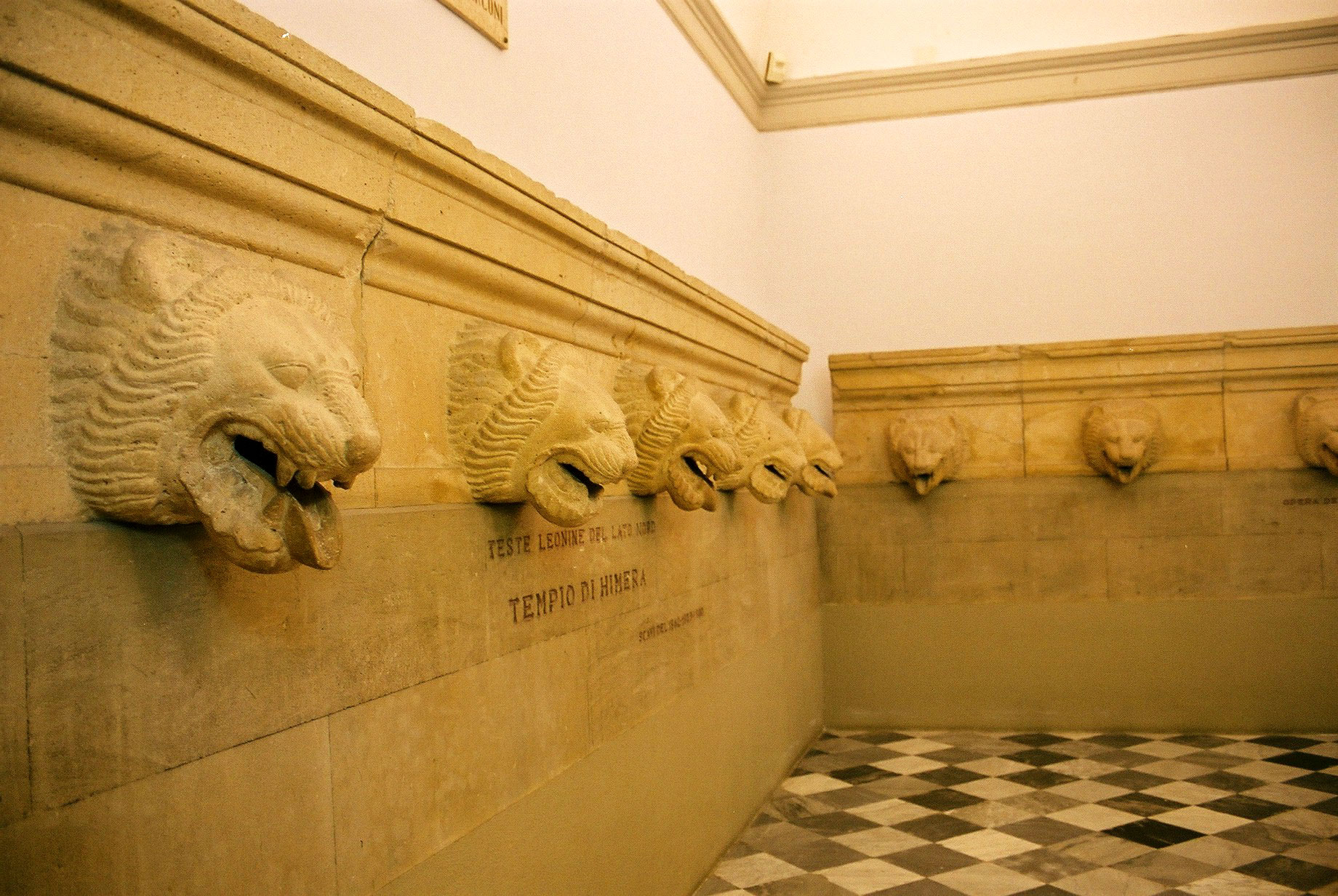
Rainwater spouts from the temple roof (Palermo museum)

== Famous people ==
Himera is said to be the birthplace of the poet Stesichorus but in fact he was born in the Magna Graecian town of Metauros (modern Gioia Tauro) in 630BC. He moved to Himera in later life and wrote his poetry whilst a resident of the town. Ergoteles, whose victory at the Olympic games is celebrated by Pindar, was a citizen, but not a native, of Himera. On the other hand, Thermae had the honour of being the birthplace of the tyrant Agathocles.

== See also ==
- List of ancient Greek cities
