= Battle of Himera (480 BC) =

Battle of the Sicilian Wars

- Part of the Sicilian Wars
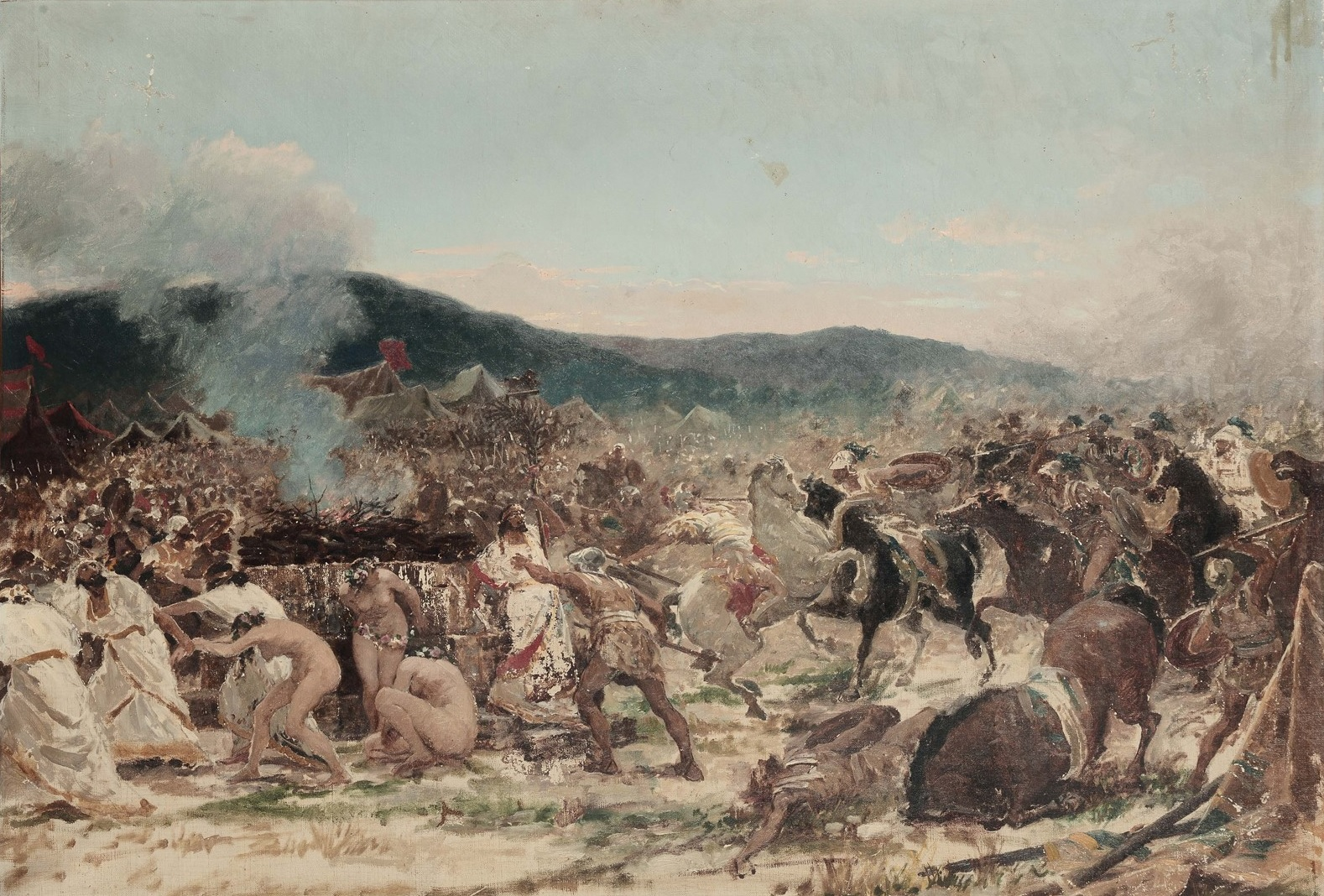
- Romanticised representation of the Battle of Himera
Date	480 BC
Location	Himera, Sicily 37°58′26.39″N 13°49′26.35″E
Result	Greek victory; Syracusan hegemony of Sicily

Belligerents
Syracuse; Akragas; Caucasian mercenaries	Carthage

Commanders and leaders
Gelo; Theron	Hamilcar †

Strength
Unknown; 50,000 infantry 5,000 cavalry	Unknown; 300,000; Modern sources estimate around 50,000

Casualties and losses
Minimal	Heavy
- Location within Mediterranean Battle of Himera (480 BC) (Italy)

The Battle of Himera (480 BC), supposedly fought on the same day as the Battle of Salamis, or at the same time as the Battle of Thermopylae, saw the Greek forces of Gelon, King of Syracuse, and Theron, tyrant of Agrigentum, defeat the Carthaginian force of Hamilcar the Magonid, ending a Carthaginian bid to restore the deposed tyrant of Himera. The alleged coincidence of this battle with the naval battle of Salamis and the resultant derailing of a Punic-Persian conspiracy aimed at destroying the Greek civilization is rejected by modern scholars. Scholars also agree that the battle led to the crippling of Carthage's power in Sicily for many decades. It was one of the most important battles of the Sicilian Wars.

The discovery in 2007 and 2008 of mass graves from the battle has confirmed the location and nature of the battle.

== Background ==
The Phoenicians had planted trading posts all over the coast of Sicily after 900 BC, but had never penetrated far inland. They had traded with the Elymian, Sicani and Siculi communities and ultimately withdrew without resistance to Motya, Panormus and Solus when the Greeks arrived after 750 BC. These cities remained independent until becoming part of the Carthaginian hegemony after 540 BC, probably when Malchus of Carthage "conquered all Sicily" and sent the captured booty to Tyre.

=== Carthaginian hegemony and Greeks in Sicily ===
Carthage created her hegemony in part to resist Greek encroachments in the Phoenician sphere of influence. Phoenicians initially (750–650 BC) did not resist the Greeks, but after the Greeks had reached Iberia sometime after 650 BC, Carthage emerged as the leader of Phoenician resistance. During the 6th century BC, mostly under the leadership of the Magonid dynasty, Carthage established a commercially dominant position in the Western Mediterranean. The Phoenicians in Sicily and the Elymians had teamed up to defeat the Greeks of Selinus and Rhodes near Lilybaeum in 580 BC, the first recorded clash between Phoenicians and Greeks incident in Sicily. The next known Greek incursion in Sicily took place 70 years later.

The Greeks living in Sicily behaved similar to mainland Greeks, expanding their political and commercial domain while keeping the Ionian-Dorian feud alive – the Dorian colonies were comparably more aggressive in expanding their territory. As Sicilian trade flourished, the Greeks and the Phoenicians became prosperous. This prosperity enabled some of the Greek cities to start to expand their territories again, ultimately leading to the events known as the First Sicilian War.

==== Carthage joins the fight ====
Carthage and the Elymians joined forces in 510 BC to oppose the expedition of Prince Dorieus, who had lost the Spartan throne and was seeking to found a colony at Eryx (after being expelled from Libya by Carthage in 511 BC). Dorieus was defeated and killed; the Greek survivors then founded Heraclea Minoa. Sicilian Greeks (probably the cities of Akragas, Gela and Selinus) fought an undated war of revenge against Carthage, leading to the destruction of Minoa and a treaty which brought economic benefits for the Greeks. An appeal for aid to avenge the death of Dorieus was ignored by the Greeks from the homeland, even by Leonidas of Sparta, the brother of Dorieus, who would later win immortal fame at Thermopylae in 480 BC. This possibly demonstrated the futility of opposing Carthage by single Greek cities or the unreliability of aid from Greece, a situation that would change with the rise of the Greek tyrants in Sicily.

=== Greek tyrants ===
While Carthage remained engaged in Sardinia after 510 BC, most of the Greek cities in Sicily fell under the rule of tyrants. The tyrants of Gela, Akragas and Rhegion successfully expanded their dominion during 505–480 BC, with the Dorian city of Gela being the most successful.

==== Dorian Greeks dominate Sicily ====
Cleander (505–498 BC) and his brother Hippocrates (498–491) of Gela successfully took over both Ionian and Dorian Greek territory, and by 490 BC, Zankle, Leontini, Catana, Naxos, and Camarina, as well as neighboring Sicel lands, had fallen to Gela. Gelon, successor of Hippocrates, captured Syracuse and made the city his capital. By using deportation and enslavement, Gelon transformed the former Ionian cities into Dorian ones and made Syracuse the dominant power in Sicily. Meanwhile, Akragas, another Dorian city, had taken over neighboring Sican and Sicel lands under the tyrant Theron (488–472 BC). To forestall any conflicts between Akragas and Syracuse, Gelon and Theron married into each other's families, thus creating a united front against the Sicels and Ionian Greeks of Sicily.

==== Ionian Greeks call on Carthage ====
To counter this Dorian threat, Anaxilas of Rhegion, who had captured Zankle from Gela in 490 BC, allied himself with Terillus of Himera and married his daughter. Himera and Rhegion next became allies of Carthage; the tyrants even built up personal relationships with the Magonid dynasty of Carthage. Selinus, a Dorian city whose territory bordered Theron's domain, also became a Carthaginian ally; the fear of Theron and the destruction of Megara Hyblaea (mother city of Selinus) by Gelon may have played a part in this decision. Thus, 3 power blocks were delicately balanced in Sicily by 483 BC: Ionians dominating the north, Carthage the west, Dorians the east and south. The Sicels and Sicans in the interior remained passive, and even if not directly under Greek rule, did not hinder the movements of their forces. The Elmyians joined the Carthaginian alliance.

== Prelude ==
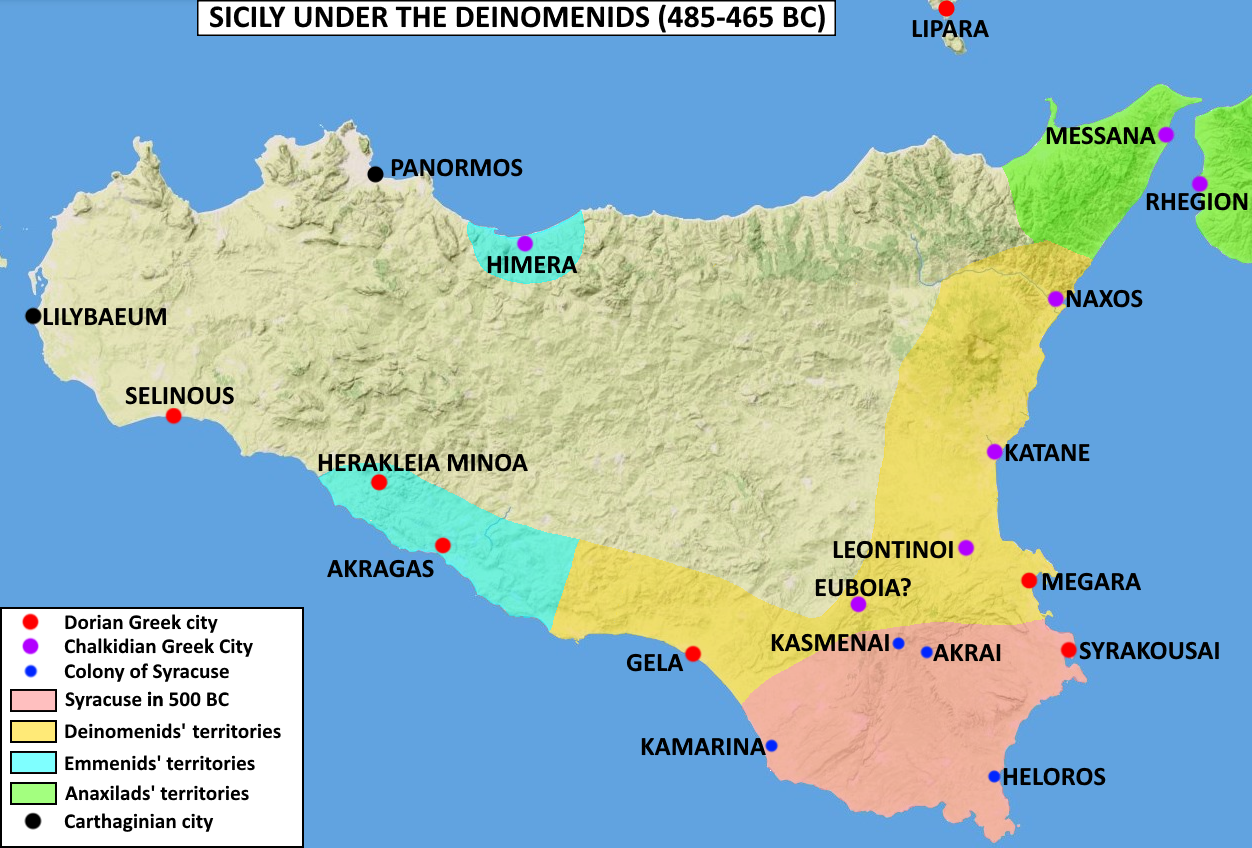
Sicily under the Deinomenids (485-465 BC)

The city of Himera had once requested Phalaris, tyrant of Akragas (570–554 BC), to rule over it. Theron emulated Phalaris when he deposed Terillus and added Himera to his domain in 483 BC. Terillus had come to power in Himera after expelling the ruling oligarchs (who had taken refuge in Akragas), and he probably lacked popular support, which may have been exploited by Theron. Terillus asked Hamilcar, Suffet of Carthage and his xenia (guest friend), for aid. Anaxilas also lobbied on his behalf, and sent his own children as hostages to Carthage as a token of loyalty. After a 3-year delay, Hamilcar led a Carthaginian expedition to Sicily in 480 BC, which coincided with the expedition of Xerxes against mainland Greece.

=== Gelon refuses aid from Greece ===
The Greeks from the homeland had sent an embassy to Gelon requesting aid against Xerxes. Gelon at first complained that the Greeks spurned his request of aid against the Carthaginians in the past, but he offered to send 24,000 infantrymen, 4000 cavalrymen and 200 warships, in addition to fully provisioning the combined Greek force, if he was made the supreme commander. The Spartans objected to this, and Gelon then asked to be the commander of either the land or naval forces in exchange for his aid. The Athenian envoy then objected, and the Greeks were sent packing empty handed. Gelon also hedged his bets by sending three ships under Cadmus of Cos to Delphi, with instructions to offer his submission to Xerxes in case of a Persian victory.

=== Carthaginian expedition ===
Hamilcar is said to have assembled an army numbering 300,000 soldiers from Iberia, Sardinia, Corsica, Italy, Gaul, and Africa, mostly mercenaries (like the famed Iberian mercenaries), under the command of a body of Carthaginian officers, along with war chariots, 200 warships and 3,000 transports for the venture. According to modern historians, the numbers are clearly inflated; the Punic army may not have been significantly larger than that of the Greek coalition. The army had no siege engines and the Etruscans and the Elymians, allies in past struggles against the Greek colonies, were not part of it.

==== Carthaginian army ====
The core units of the army came from Africa. The heavy African infantry fought in close formation, armed with long spears and round shields, wearing helmets and linen cuirasses. The light Libyan infantry carried javelins and small shields. The Iberian infantry wore purple bordered white tunics and leather headgear, and fought in a dense phalanx, armed with heavy javelins, long body shields and short thrusting swords. Sardinian and Gallic infantry fought in their native gear, but often were equipped by Carthage.

The Libyans, Carthaginian citizens and the Libyo-Phoenicians provided disciplined, well trained cavalry equipped with thrusting spears and round shields. Iberians and Gauls also provided cavalry, which relied on the all out charge. Libyans also provided the bulk of the heavy, four-horse war chariots for Carthage.

=== Sicilian Greek army ===
Gelon and Theron had a well-trained, battle-tested army at their disposal. In addition to citizens, hired Greek, Sicel, Caucasian and Sican mercenaries augmented their forces. Gelon took out a loan from the citizenry to fund his war efforts, which indicates the seriousness of the situation. The Syracusan army at Himera is said to have numbered 50,000 infantrymen and 5,000 cavalrymen – perhaps another exaggeration. The size of Theron's army is not known. Most of the hoplites and some of the peltasts were citizens of the Sicilian Greek cities. They were augmented by mercenaries hired from Sicily, Italy and Greece. The wealthier citizens formed the cavalry units. Mercenaries provided archers, slingers and cavalry.

== Himera campaign ==
Hamilcar chose not to sail to Selinus and then attack Akragas, although it was the coast closest to Carthage. The Carthaginian fleet, escorted by 60 triremes, sailed to Panormus instead. Hamilcar chose this course probably because restoring Terillus was his primary objective. The conquest of Sicily, if that indeed was a consideration, took second place to his duty as a guest and friend of Terillus. The fleet was battered by storms at sea, losing the ships carrying the chariots and horses – which was a significant factor in the coming battle. The Greek fleet, able to muster 200 ships, did not contest the crossing, and in fact played no part in the coming battle.

=== Carthaginian camps at Himera ===
Hamilcar spent three days reorganizing his forces at Panormus, and repairing his battered fleet. The Carthaginians marched along the coast to Himera, with the fleet sailing alongside, and encamped near the city. Theron was already present in Himera with his army, but the Greeks did not interfere with Carthaginian operations. The Greek allies of Hamilcar (Greeks of Selinus and Anaxilas of Rhegion) were absent – and never joined the battle.

The city of Himera sits on top of a hill (300–400 feet high) on the western bank of the River Himera. The hill is steep in the northern, western and eastern sides but gradually slopes to the south. There are hills to the west and south of the city. The Carthaginians erected two camps near Himera. The sea camp was set to the north of Himera by the sea, surrounded by a palisade and a ditch. The army was billeted in a separate camp to the south on a low hill west of Himera. The land and sea camps were joined by siege works.

=== Theron's defeat and Gelon's arrival ===
It is not known if Hamilcar wished to build siege weapons at Himera or settle the issue through battle. After the camps were erected, the Punic ships dropped off provisions at the sea camp and were sent to Sardinia and Africa for more supplies. Twenty triremes patrolled the sea and the rest of the ships were beached in the sea camp. Himera was not fully invested – the east and south sides were open.

Hamilcar led a picked body of men on reconnaissance mission, and defeated the Greeks in a pitched battle outside Himera. The Greeks blocked the west gates of Himera and their morale also fell, while the Carthaginian foragers ranged the territory of Himera. Theron sent messages to Gelon, who arrived with his army and encamped across the river. Gelon's cavalry managed to capture many of the foragers, as Hamilcar had no cavalry present to counter his moves. The morale in Himera improved, and the bricked-up gates were cleared on Gelon's orders.

== Battle ==
Herodotus and Diodorus Siculus give different versions of the battle, which are hard to reconcile. Diodorus provides a more detailed account.

=== Herodotus on Himera ===
The Greek and Punic armies fought from dawn to dusk, while Hamilcar watched the battle from his camp and offered sacrifices to Baal in a huge fire. No information on numbers, battle formation or battle site is given. When the Carthaginian army was routed towards dusk, Hamilcar jumped into the sacrificial fire. His body was never found and the Greeks erected a monument to his memory where he supposedly died. Herodotus noted that Sicilian tradition held that this battle and the battle of Salamis were fought on the same day.

First Battle of Himera 480 BC. A generic representation, not to exact scale, geographic features partially shown and path of troop movements and dispositions are indicative because of lack of primary source data.

=== Diodorus Siculus and other sources ===
The actions of the Greek cavalry in countering Carthaginian foragers prompted Hamilcar to send a letter to Selinus requesting them to send their cavalry to Himera on a given date that Hamilcar was to offer a sacrifice to Poseidon – a Greek deity whose worship probably required the presence of Greeks. The letter was intercepted by Gelon's men. Gelon planned to use his own cavalry to impersonate the Selinute reinforcement and infiltrate the Carthaginian camp, while his army attacked the land camp.

==== Greeks attack the land camp ====
Gelon's horsemen left their camp on the night before the appointed day, and at daybreak they arrived at the Carthaginian sea camp and were admitted into it. Greeks spotted them inside the Carthaginian camp from Himera and signaled Gelon. It is not known if the Syracusan army was inside Gelon's camp or had assembled somewhere outside at that time. The Greeks marched around the south end of Himera and moved towards the Carthaginian land camp. Theron and his army stayed put in Himera. The Carthaginian army left their camp and formed up on the hill, forcing the Greeks to fight an uphill battle. The struggle was fierce and long and neither side gained any advantages.

==== Death of Hamilcar ====
Sometime after the battle was joined, the disguised Greek horsemen killed Hamilcar while he was preparing the sacrifice, and then set fire to the beached ships, causing great confusion at the sea camp. It is not known what further role the Greek cavalry played in the battle. The Carthaginians rushed to launch whatever ships they could save and some of the ships, overcrowded with soldiers, left the site altogether. When the news of Hamilcar's death and the burning of ships reach the fighting armies, the Greeks pressed harder and routed the Carthaginians, who fled to their camp.

In an alternative version, Gelon ordered Pediarchos, his captain of archers, to "dress as the tyrant" to impersonate him and offer sacrifices in front of the camp. Pediarchos was surrounded by archers who had concealed bows in their dress while he impersonated Gelon. Hamilcar was obliged to come out to offer sacrifices also, and the bowmen shot him down.

==== Theron takes action ====
Gelon's army stormed the Carthaginian camp and the Greeks scattered to loot the tents. The Iberians of the Carthaginian army reformed, and they attacked the now disordered Greeks, inflicting severe casualties. The Greeks fought back, but they were hard pressed and the Iberians got the upper hand in the struggle. At this critical juncture Theron decided to join the battle. He directed his attack on the flank and rear of the Iberian position inside the camp and also set fire to tents near them. The Iberians finally gave way, and retreated to the ships still afloat. Other Carthaginian survivors left the camp and retreated to a hill inland, where they attempted to defend themselves. The hill was waterless and they were ultimately forced to surrender. About half of the Carthaginian army and majority of the fleet was destroyed, numerous prisoners and rich booty had fallen into Greek hands. It is commented that the surviving Carthaginian ships were sunk in a storm on their return journey to Africa.

== Aftermath ==
Gelon and Theron did not attack Rhegion or the Carthaginian territory in Sicily after the battle. Carthage initially manned the city walls and prepared for a Greek invasion of Africa, rather than for another Sicilian expedition. Gelon offered mild terms to the Carthaginian embassy that arrived asking for a ceasefire. Carthage paid 2,000 silver talents as indemnity and erected two monuments in memory of the Battle of Himera, but lost no territory. Selinus and Rhegion also came to terms with Syracuse, and Anaxilas married his daughter to Hieron I, brother of Gelon. The status quo before the battle was reestablished - Terillus being the ultimate loser. Greek culture and trade flourished in Sicily. Gelon, Theron and Hieron built public buildings using the slaves and spoils gained from the battle, such as the Temple of Victory. An era of prosperity began, but infighting among the tyrants ensured that the peace was not unbroken. Carthage focused on expanding in Africa, leaving Sicily alone for 70 years. Apart from an obscure clash in 454 BC, the Greeks and Phoenicians did not engage in further fighting on the island during this period.

Himera remained in the possession of Akragas until 472 BC. Theron expelled the Ionians after they attempted a coup and settled the city with Dorian Greeks. By 466 BC, the Sicilian Greek cities had broken away from the dominions of Gelon and Theron and had overthrown the tyrants' heirs, so in place of three Greek power blocs dominating Sicily (those of Syracuse, Akragas and Rhegion), eleven bickering Greek commonwealths came into being by 461 BC. They continued the Ionian-Dorian feud in full force. Their actions ultimately led to the Second Sicilian War and the final destruction of Himera in 409 BC.

=== 2008 mass grave discovery ===
During the construction of a railway extension in 2008, near the site of the ancient Greek city of Himera, archeologists uncovered more than 10,000 graves. A number of these held the remains of 5th century BC soldiers. Researchers note that DNA sequencing determined that warriors who took part in the second battle were mercenaries brought from as far as modern-day Ukraine and Latvia.
