= Charondas =

6th-century BC Greek legislator and statesman

Caronda, Antichissimo legislatore d'Italia, istituiva in questa sua città nel settimo secolo avanti Cristo il primo celebrato ginnasio condotto da uomini liberi a spese dello Stato.

Poche leggi dava e molte norme di pubblico e privato costume alla Sicilia e alla Magna Grecia e santificandole con l'esempio meritava gloria immortale qual fondatore austerissimo di civiltà.

(Charondas, an ancient Italian legislator, established in his city in the seventh century BC the first celebrated gymnasium ruled by free men using state expenses.

He gave few laws and many rules about public and private custom both to Sicily and Magna Graecia and sanctifying them by example he deserved immortal glory as a most austere founder of civilization.)

Epigraph by Mario Rapisardi at the entrance of the Roman Amphitheatre of Catania.

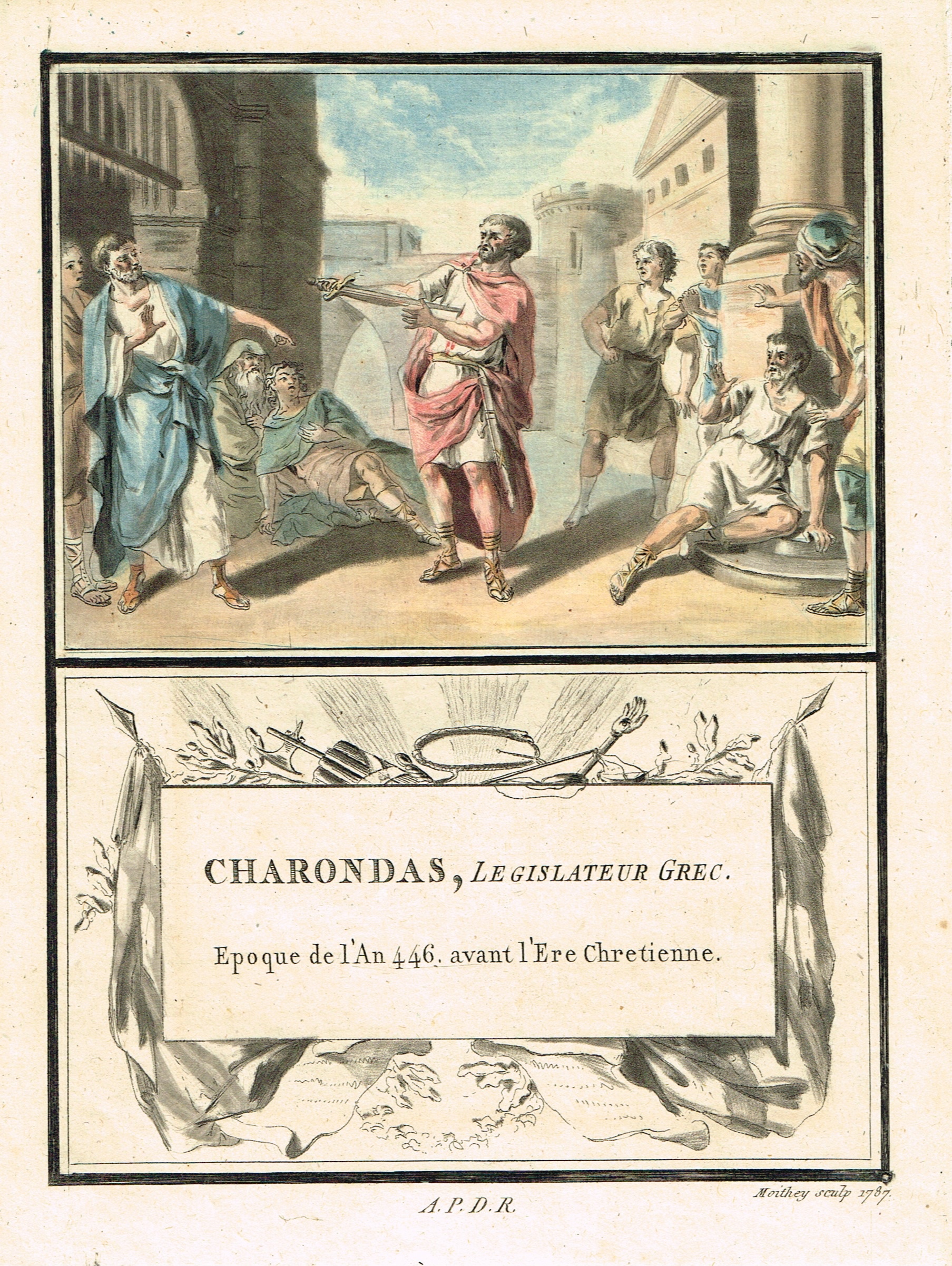
French illustration from 1787 depicting the suicide of Charondas, as described by Diodorus Siculus

Charondas (Ancient Greek: Χαρώνδας) was a celebrated lawgiver of Catania in Sicily. It is uncertain when he lived; some identify him as a pupil of Pythagoras (c. 580 – 504 BC), but all that can be said is that he lived earlier than Anaxilas of Rhegium (494 – 476 BC), as his laws were in use by the Rhegians until they were abolished by Anaxilas. His laws, originally written in verse, were adopted by the other Chalcidic colonies in Sicily and Italy.

According to Aristotle, there was nothing special about these laws except that Charondas introduced actions for perjury, but he speaks highly of the precision with which they were devised, while Plato speaks of him positively in The Republic. The story that Charondas killed himself because he entered the public assembly wearing a sword, which was a violation of his own law, is also told of Diocles of Syracuse and Zaleucus. The fragments of laws attributed to him by Stobaeus and Diodorus are of late (Neo-Pythagorean) origin. Charondas is said to have commanded that if the nearest relative of an epikleros (something close to an heiress) did not wish to marry her, he was required to provide a dowry.
