= Zaleucus =

7th-century BC Greek lawgiver

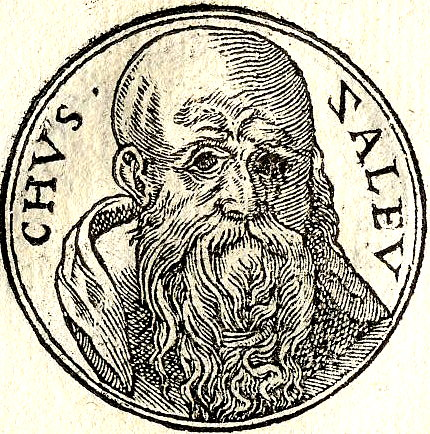
Zaleucus from "Promptuarii Iconum Insigniorum "

Zaleucus (Ancient Greek: Ζάλευκος; fl. 7th century BC) was the Greek lawgiver of Epizephyrian Locris, in Magna Graecia. According to the Suda, he worked as a shepherd and was kept a slave before receiving an education and turning to law-making. Some sources make him a Pythagorean philosopher, although older ones put him as older than Pythagoras or even deny his existence altogether. They also attribute divine origin to his laws.

Most probably, he devised the first written European law code, the Locrian code, in the 7th century BC. The code, however, is lost except for some later mentions and imitations which seem clearly anachronistic. These, which among other things mention that:

A free-born woman may not be accompanied by more than one female slave, unless she is drunk; she may not leave the city during the night, unless she is an adulteress; she may not wear gold jewelry or a garment with a purple border, unless she is a courtesan; and a husband may not wear a gold-studded ring or a cloak of Milesian fashion unless he is bent upon prostitution or adultery.

It also banned the drinking of undiluted wine except for medical purposes.

Although the Locrian code distinctly favored the aristocracy, Zaleucus was famous for his conciliation of societal factions. No other facts of his life at all are certain. According to legends, he punished adultery with the forfeiture of sight. When his own son was condemned of this, he refused to exonerate him, instead submitting to the loss of one of his own eyes instead of exacting the full penalty of the culprit. Another law that he established forbade anyone from entering the Senate House armed. Faced with an emergency, he did so anyway, but when he was reminded of the law, he immediately fell upon his sword as a sacrifice to the sovereignty of the claims of social order. A similar story is told of Charondas.

Anyone who proposed a new law, or the alteration of one already existing, had to appear before the Citizen's Council with a rope round his neck. If the Council voted against the proposal the proposer was immediately strangled.

Demosthenes (in "Against Timocrates"), who to persuade the Athenians not to change any law upon small and frivolous pretences, gives the example of these Locrians, with whom, says he, it's a law, that a man who shall propose to make any new law shall do it with a rope about his neck, which he shall be strangled in, if he do not carry his point: which has been such a guard and defence to the laws, that there has been but one new one made in MORE THAN TWO HUNDRED YEARS. (Demost. in Timocr. p. 469.) Now. that Demosthenes here speaks of Zaleucus's laws is plain enough from his naming the Locrians; but it appears further from the law itself. For Hierocles and Polybius's author say expressly, that this law about the rope was Zaleucus's; (Hieroc. apud Stobaeum, Serm. 37. Polyb. xii, p. 661.)
