= First Sicilian War =

480 BC war

- Part of the Sicilian Wars
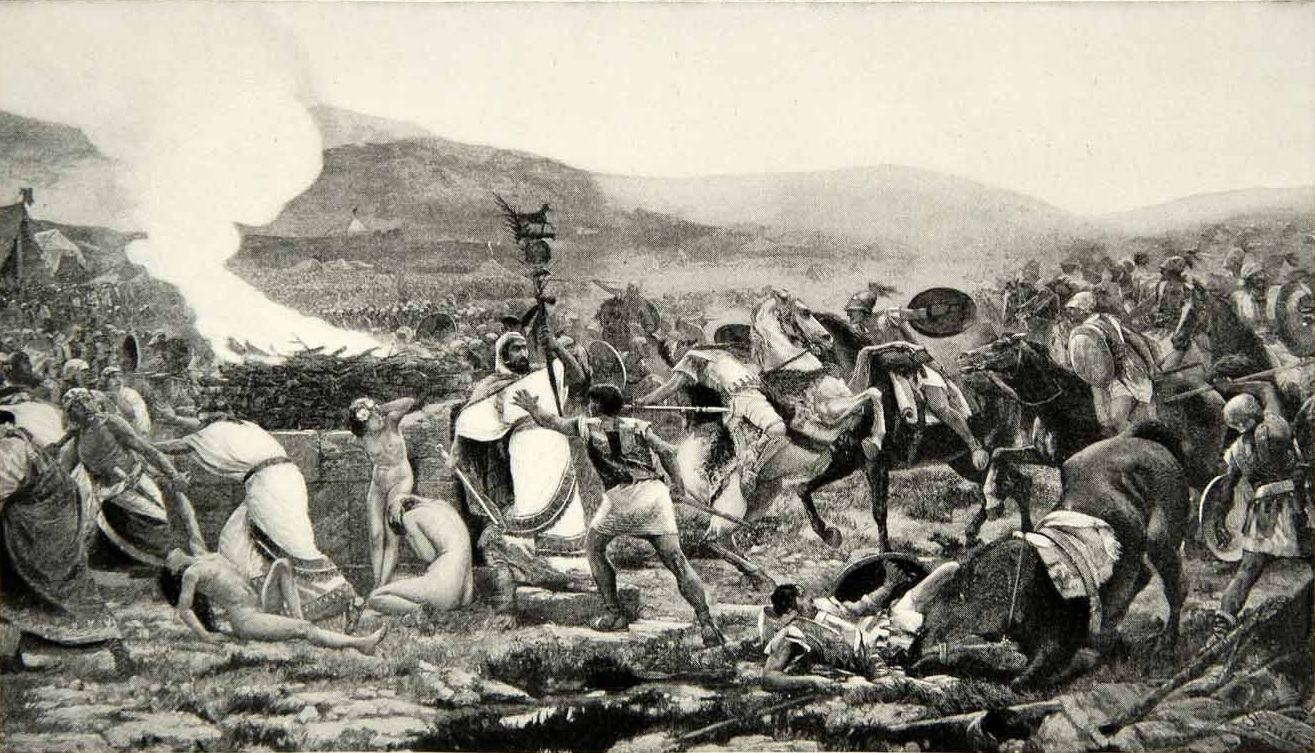
- The Battle of Himera, the largest engagement in the First Sicilian War.
Date	c. 480 BC
Location	Northern Sicily
Result	Greek victory
Territorial changes	Status quo ante bellum

Belligerents
Gela; Akragas	Carthage

Commanders and leaders
Gelon; Theron	Hamilcar †; Terillus

Strength
50,000 infantry 5,000 cavalry	30,000-50,000; 200 warships

The First Sicilian War, sometimes called the First Puno-Syracusan War, was a major conflict in Sicily between Carthage and Syracuse. It was the initial conflict that started the Sicilian Wars.

The war broke out after Terillus, tyrant of Himera, was overthrown by Theron, tyrant of Akragas. After appealing to Carthage, Hamilcar led an expedition into Himera in an attempt to restore Terillus as tyrant. Eventually, after reaching Himera, the Carthaginian army was defeated in a major engagement wherein Hamilcar was killed and the Carthaginians returned to their capital, expecting another attack.

== Background ==
=== Greek colonies ===
Throughout antiquity, the island of Sicily and the nearby Italian peninsula had been inhabited by Greek colonies (see Magna Graecia). From the mid-eighth century BC, Sicily in particular was heavily dominated by Greek colonies, some being very powerful in the region, such as Syracuse, Akragas, Selinus, and Segesta.

=== Carthage ===
Originally a Phoenician colony, Carthage quickly expanded into North Africa throughout the 5th century BC. Mainly through annexation, but also by forming alliances with Utica, Hippacra, Lepcis, and cities as far east as Tripoli. Carthage in antiquity heavily influenced maritime trade in the Mediterranean. Eventually, the Punic "empire" began trading with Etruscan cities and in the sixth century developed a trade treaty between them and the newly established Roman Republic.

However, Carthage eventually developed expansionary ambitions, particularly in Sicily and later Sardinia and Corsica.

=== Battle of Lilybaeum ===
In 580 BC, the Greeks, led by Pentathlus, attempted to establish a settlement in Sicily far away from their homelands of Cnidus and Rhodes. This was because their home islands were under the control of the "kings of Asia", possibly Lydia, but they remained unnamed in Diodorus' account.

The settlement was placed in a strategic location: in a point that separated the Phoenician settlement of Motya from the cities to its north. Eventually, Pentathlus found himself involved in a conflict between Selinus and Segesta.

The Segestans, allied to the Carthaginians, led by Malchus, defeated the expedition and later established Lilybaeum at the site of the battle. It's important to note that the Carthaginians likely did not participate in the battle. The battle did, however, draw Carthaginian attention to the island.

=== Carthaginian interest in Sicily and Sardinia ===
Under Mazeus, a Carthaginian general, Punic ambitions in the region were enacted upon. However, it appears that Mazeus' war in Sicily provided little strategic value to Carthage, despite conquering a part of Sicily.

After conquering a presumably small portion of Sicily, Mazeus campaigned in Sardinia, where many of his forces were killed. The survivors, alongside Mazeus, were exiled. Afterwards, he returned to Carthage and besieged it until the king allowed his return. Despite returning, he was executed for crucifying his son and plotting a coup d'état to seize power.

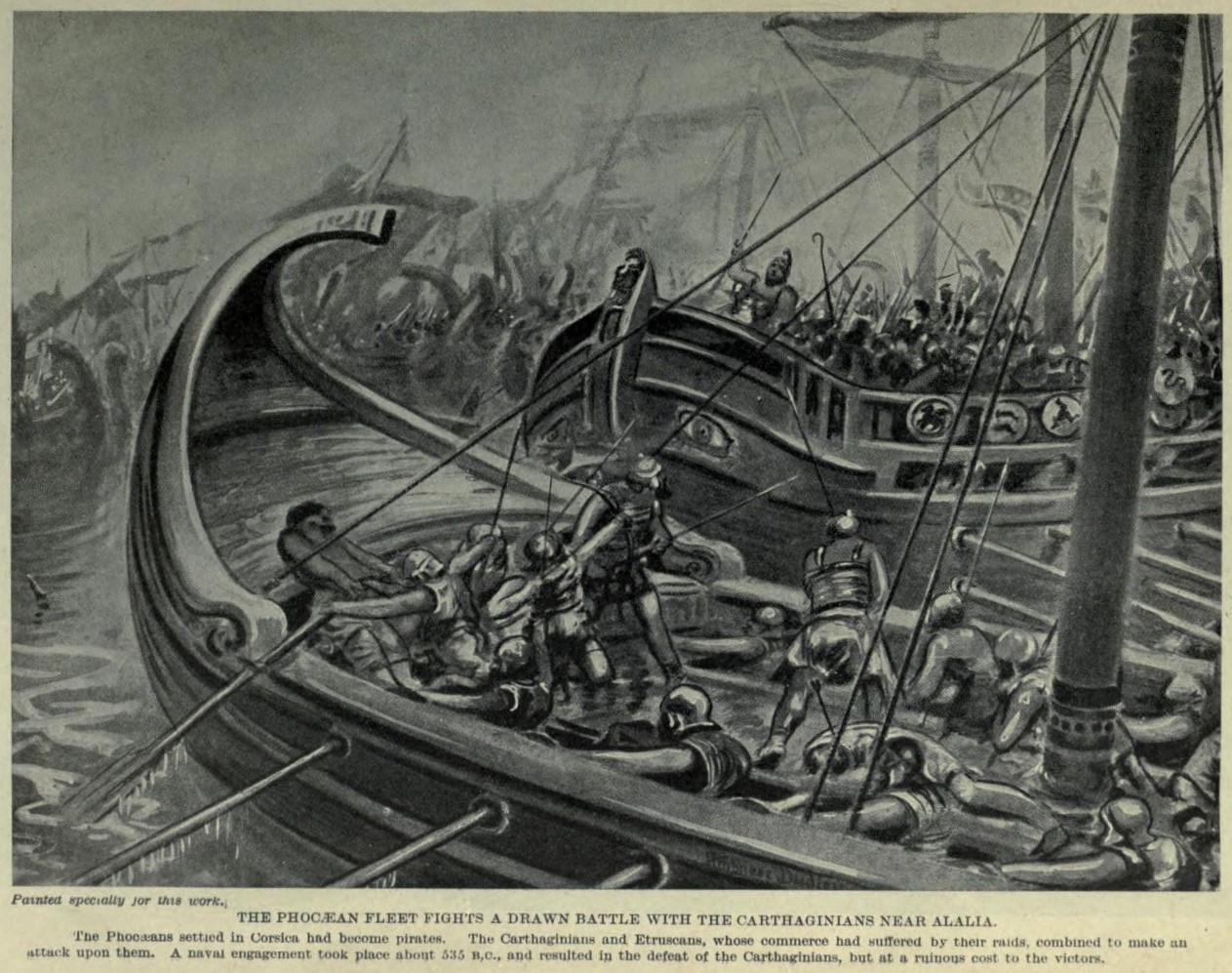
The Battle of Alalia (540 or 535 BC)

=== Battle of Alalia ===
The colony of Alalia was established around the year 565 BC. In c. 545, Harpagos laid siege to Phokaia (Phocaea). After the siege, a majority of the Phocaean population migrated to Alalia. These new colonists lived alongside the former for around five years, raiding cities on the eastern coast of the island of Corsica. Because of this, the Carthaginians, alongside the Etruscans, attacked the colony with sixty triremes. Despite their numerical inferiority, the Greeks would defeat the Carthaginians in the Strait of Bonifacio in a Cadmean victory.

Despite defeating the Carthaginians, which is hotly debated among historians today due to the nature of their victory, the Phocaeans fled once more to Rhegium, later moving to Oinotria, which they named Hyële.

== Prelude to the war ==
In c. 491/0 BC, Gelon would oust the leaders of the city of Gela, Euclides and Cleander. Afterwards, he made himself tyrant of the city. In 485/4, he conquered Syracuse during a period of political tumult in the city, moving his seat of government there. Alongside the government, he also moved the whole population of Camarina and half of the inhabitants of Gela to Syracuse. Following the conquest of Syracuse, he instated Hiero to the rest of his territories, while Gela himself ruled over the newly conquered region.

=== "Pan-Sicilian" alliance ===
In 489, Theron seized power in Akragas. Afterwards, the two cities of Gela and Akragas seemed to have a friendly relationship. Gelon and Theron both established a strong alliance that encompassed most of all Greek settlements in Sicily. The only establishments outside of this alliance were the cities of Selinus, Messene, and Himera.

=== Puno-Terillus alliance ===
In 483, Terillus, leader of Himera, was overthrown by Theron, tyrant of Akragas. Afterwards, alongside Anaxilas, tyrant of Rhegium and Messene, he appealed to Hamilcar for his restoration. To show his devotion, Anaxilaus sent his children as hostages to the Carthaginians. This act swayed them to his side, now ready to act. Following the establishment of an alliance between Theron and Gelon, Terillus established his own alliance with Messene and Rhegium.

=== Agreements with Persia ===
After the Puno-Terrilus alliance, the Carthaginians agreed, alongside the Persians, to apply pressure onto the Greek world from both sides. In 480 BC, a large war had broken out between the Persians and numerous Greek states. The agreement would entail an invasion of the Hellenistic world from the Persians in the east and the Carthaginians in the west, eliminating the Greeks from both Hellas and Italy.

== Outbreak of the war ==
When the war broke out, Gelon and Theron framed the defense of Sicily as a holy war. During the war, both armies would be fueled by both religious and ethnic hatred, often ending in the razing and massacre of cities and temples. The latter was a sign that the invader wanted to entirely eradicate the enemy's culture. The Greeks, alongside the Persians, found many Carthaginian practices to be obscene, such as child sacrifice. The archaic practice was entirely abandoned by most Phoenicians, but the Carthaginians kept it for an unknown reason.

=== Battle of Himera ===
When the war began in 480, the Carthaginians attempted to lead an expedition through Sicily, led by Hamilcar. Herodotus states the force consisted of three hundred thousand Phoenicians, Libyans, Iberians, Ligurians, Elisyces, Sardinians, and Corsicans, but this number is most definitely exaggerated. Hamilcar's expeditionary force also consisted of over two hundred warships, but this might also be inflated.

However, as Hamilcar crossed the Libyan Sea, he encountered a storm that destroyed much of the vessels carrying his cavalry. When he eventually docked in the harbor of Panormus, he stated that he had finished the war; for he had been afraid the sea would rescue the Siceliotes from the perils of the conflict.

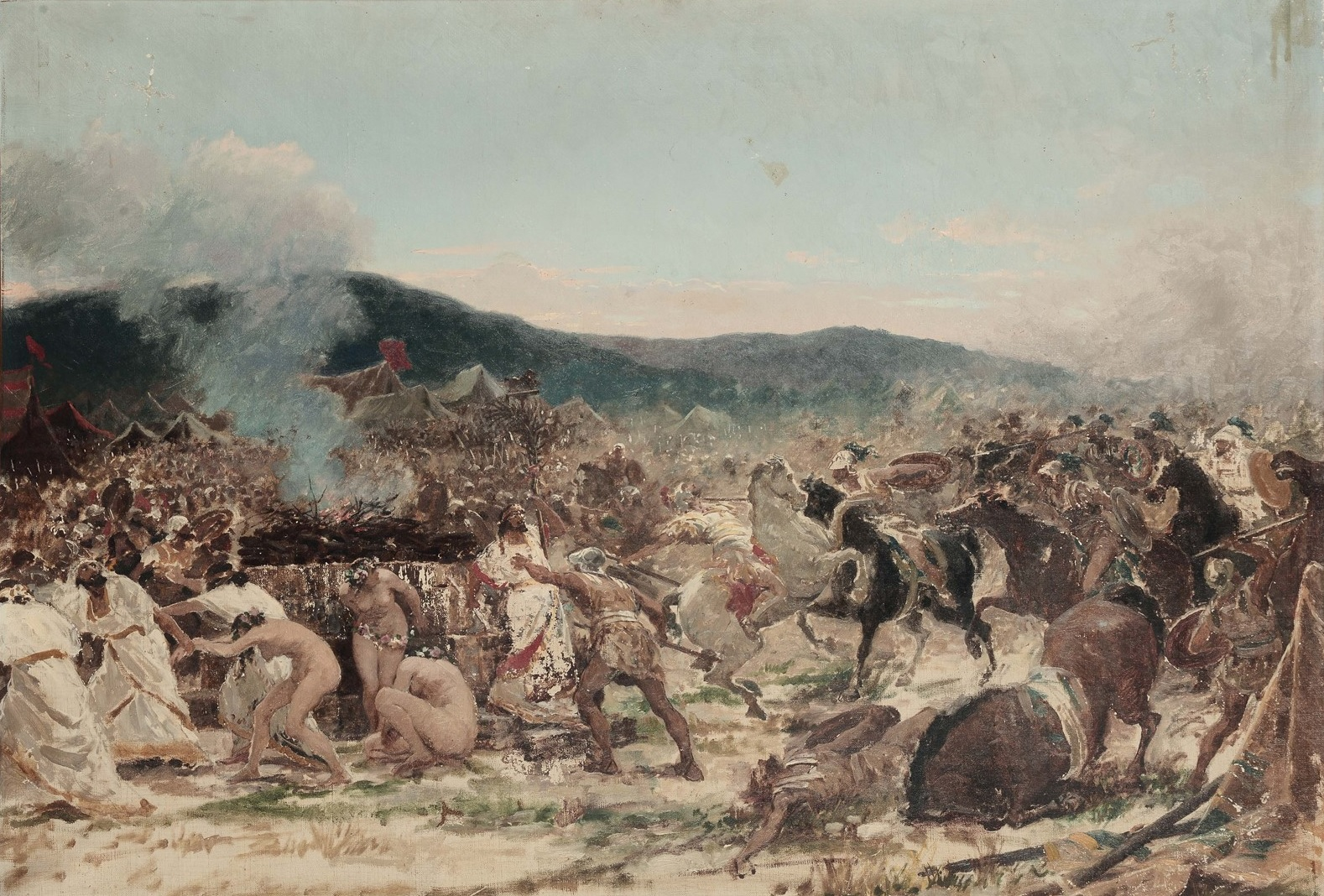
Romanticized depiction of the Battle of Himera

He rested for three days, later beginning his expedition to Himera. Guided by Terillus, the force marched along the coast with the fleet following. When they arrived, only Theron was present. Afterwards, the Carthaginians besieged Himera. Theron attempted to defeat Hamilcar in a battle, but his army was routed and Theron fled to Syracuse to ask for Gelon's support. Immediately after, Gelon's forces marched out of Syracuse with 50,000 infantry and 5,000 cavalry. Since these forces are more than Syracuse alone could've provided, it's clear that Gelon had prepared for the invasion and called upon his many allies for their assistance. Alongside his 55,000 strong force, Gelon also recruited 10,000 mercenaries, bolstering his force to 65,000, although the figure may be exaggerated.

When the two forces met, supposedly on the same day as the Battle of Salamis or Thermopylae, the Carthaginians were defeated and Hamilcar either burned himself or deserted the battlefield. The battle also resulted in the death of Hamilcar while he was busy with sacrifice and the burning of many warships of the Carthaginian fleet.

=== Following Himera ===
The disastrous Punic defeat at Himera led to a boost in morale for the Greeks, still engaged in combat with the Persians. Following the battle, the Carthaginians returned to Carthage, believing that Gelon would sail there next. The Carthaginian morale also sunk due to the enormous casualties. Afterwards, the Carthaginians sent an embassy to Gelon. In the embassy, they begged for Gelon's favor in the imminent treaty.

== Aftermath ==
Following the war, neither side gained or lost any territory. Instead, in the treaty, Gelon demanded an indemnity of 2,000 talents, just enough to pay for the cost of the war. The Phoenician settlements were allowed to remain in Sicily. In future endeavors, however, this would change. The victory in the war also led to the Greeks no longer fearing Carthage, but rather experiencing an intense disdain for them.
