= List of compositions by Giovanni Paisiello =

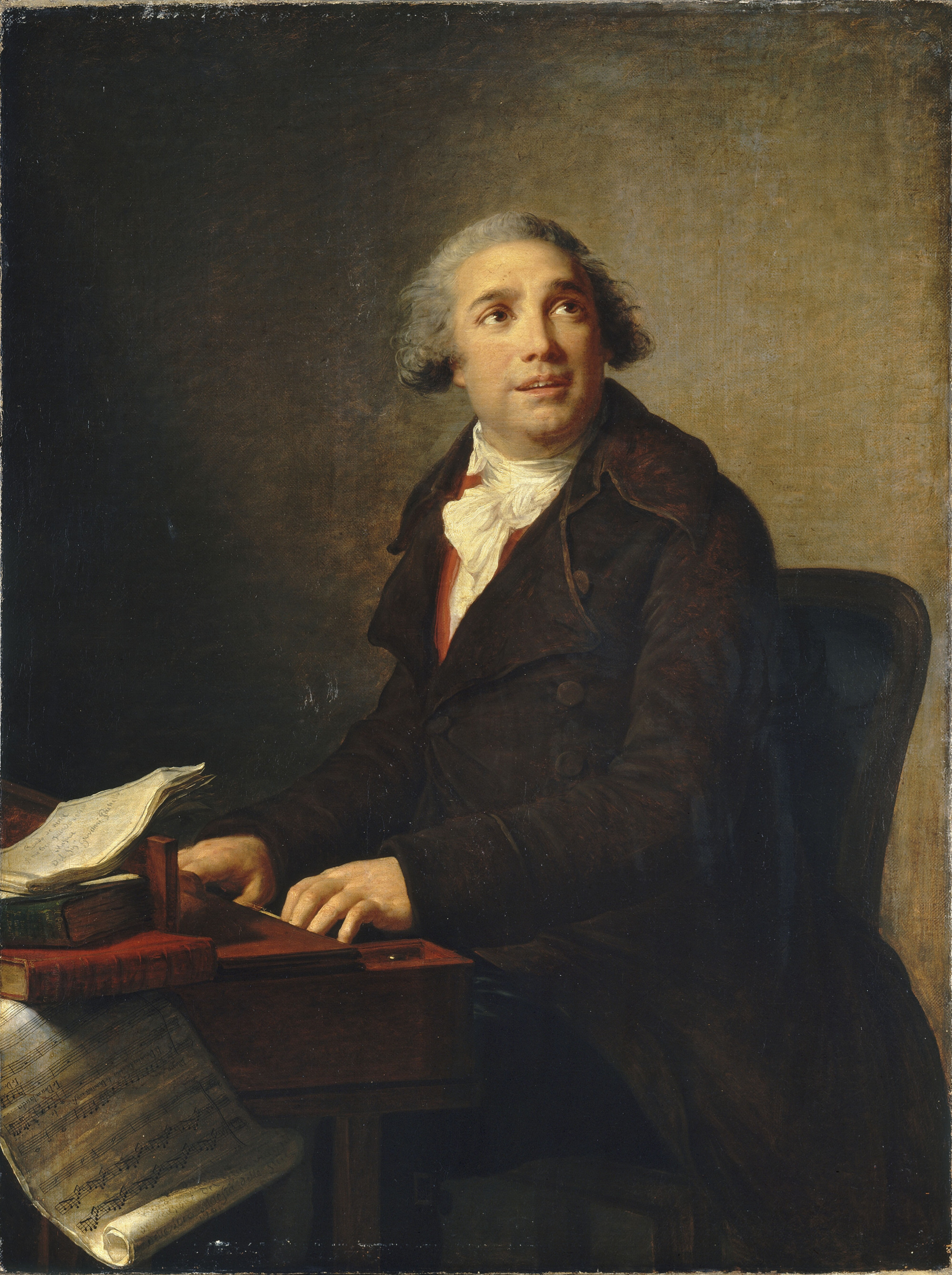
Giovanni Paisiello at the clavichord, by Élisabeth Vigée Le Brun, 1791. The score is Nina, o sia La pazza per amore.

Giovanni Paisiello (1740–1816) was an Italian composer of the Classical period, best known for his operas.

He composed 94 operas, including Il barbiere di Siviglia (1782) and Nina, o sia la pazza per amore (1789). Nel cor più non mi sento, from his opera La molinara, is also a notable work. Paisiello was one of the leading opera composers of the late eighteenth century and influenced the development of Italian opera. His operatic style influenced Mozart and Rossini.

== Operas ==
- R 1.00 La moglie in calzoni (18.2.1764, Modena)
- R 1.01 Il ciarlone (12.5.1764, Bologna) – lost
- R 1.02 I francesi brillanti (24.6.1764, Bologna)
- R 1.03 Madama l'umorista, o Gli stravaganti (26.1.1765, Modena) – lost
- R 1.04 L'amore in ballo (carnival 1765, Venice S Moisè)
- R 1.05 La mascherata delle nozze di Bacco e d'Arianna (11.2.1765, Modena)
- I bagni d'Abano (spring 1765, Parma)
- Il negligente (1765, Parma)
- Pulcinella vendicato nel ritorno di marechiaro (1765, Naples, Teatro Bellini)
- R 1.05a Le virtuose ridicole (1765, Parma)
- R 1.06 Le nozze disturbate (carnival 1776, Venice S Moisè)
- R 1.07 Le finte contesse (2.1766, Rome Valle) [Il Marchese di Tulissano?]
- R 1.08 La vedova di bel genio (spring 1766, Naples, Teatro Nuovo)
- R 1.09 Le 'mbroglie de le Bajasse (carnival 1767, Naples) – lost
- R 1.09a La serva fatta padrona (summer 1769, Naples) 2nd version of Le 'mbroglie de le Bajasse
- R 1.10 L'idolo cinese (spring 1767, Naples, Teatro Nuovo)
- R 1.11 Licenza to L'idolo cinese
- R 1.12 Lucio Papirio dittatore (summer 1767, Naples, Teatro di S Carlo)
- R 1.13 Il furbo malaccorto (winter 1767, Naples, Teatro Nuovo)
- R 1.14 Alceste in Ebuda, ovvero Olimpia (20.1.1768, Naples, Teatro di S Carlo)
- R 1.15 Le nozze di Peleo e Tetide (31.5.1768, Naples PR) [Festa teatrale in musica]
- R 1.16 Licenza to Peleo
- R 1.17 La luna abitata (summer 1768, Naples, Teatro Nuovo)
- R 1.18 La finta maga per vendetta (autumn? 1768, Naples, Teatro dei Fiorentini)
- R 1.19 L'osteria di Marechiaro (winter 1768, Naples, Teatro dei Fiorentini)
- R 1.20 La Claudia vendicata (performed as act III of L'osteria 1770, Naples)
- R 1.21 Don Chisciotte della Mancia (summer 1769, Naples, Teatro dei Fiorentini)
- R 1.22 L'arabo cortese (winter 1769 Naples, Teatro Nuovo)
- R 1.23 La Zelmira, o sia La marina del Granatello (summer 1770 Naples, Teatro Nuovo)
- R 1.24 Le trame per amore (7.10.1770 Naples, Teatro Nuovo)
- R 1.25 Demetrio (Lent 1771, Modena)
- R 1.26 Annibale in Torino (16.1.1771 Turin, Teatro Regio di Torino)
- R 1.27 La somiglianza de' nomi (spring 1771 Naples, Teatro Nuovo)
- R 1.28 and 1.29 I scherzi d'amore e di fortuna (summer 1771 Naples, Teatro Nuovo)
- R 1.30 Artaserse (26.12.1771 Modena)
- R 1.31 Semiramide in villa (carnival 1772 Rome, Teatro Capranica)
- R 1.32 Motezuma (1.1772 Rome, Dame)
- R 1.33 La Dardanè (spring 1772 Naples, Teatro Nuovo)
- R 1.34 Gli amante comici (autumn 1772 Naples, Teatro Nuovo)
- Don Anchise Campanone (1773 Venice) [rev. Gli amante comici]
- R 1.35 L'innocente fortunata (carnival 1773 Venice S Moisè)
- R 1.36 Sismano nel Mogol (carnival 1773 Milan, Teatro Regio Ducale)
- R 1.37 Il tamburo (spring 1773 Naples, Teatro Nuovo) [Il tamburo notturno]
- R 1.38 La semplice fortunata (summer 1773, Naples)
- R 1.39 Alessandro nell'Indie (26.12.1773 Modena) – fragment
- R 1.40 Andromeda (carnival 1774 Milan, Teatro Regio Ducale)
- R 1.41 Il duello (spring 1774 Naples, Teatro Nuovo)
- R 1.42 Il credulo deluso (autumn 1774 Naples, Teatro Nuovo)
- R 1.43 La frascatana (autumn 1774 Venice, S Samuele) [L'infante de Zamora]
- R 1.44 Il divertimento dei numi (4.12.1774 Naples, Reale)
- R 1.45 Demofoonte (carnival 1775 Venice, S Benedetto)
- R 1.46 La discordia fortunata (carnival 1775 Venice, S Samuele) [L'avaro deluso]
- R 1.47 Le astuzie amorose (spring 1775 Naples, Teatro Nuovo)
- R 1.48 Socrate immaginario (autumn 1775 Naples, Teatro Nuovo)
- R 1.49 Il gran Cid (3.11.1775 Florence, Teatro La Pergola)
- R 1.50 Le due contesse (3.1.1776 Rome, Teatro Capranica in Palazzo alla Valle)
- R 1.51 La disfatta di Dario (carnival 1776 Rome, Teatro Argentina)
- R 1.52 Dal finto il vero (spring 1776 Naples, Teatro Nuovo)
- R 1.53 Il finto spettro (26.12.1776, Mannheim)
- R 1.54 Nitteti (28.1.1777 St. Petersburg)
- R 1.55 Lucinda e Armidoro (autumn 1777 St. Petersburg)
- R 1.56 Achille in Sciro (6.2.1778 St. Petersburg)
- R 1.57 Lo sposo burlato (24.7.1778 St. Petersburg)
- R 1.58 Gli astrologi immaginari (14.2.1779 St. Petersburg, Hermitage) [I filosofi immaginari], [Le philosophe imaginaire]
- R 1.59 Demetrio (13.6.1779, Tsarskoye Selo)
- R 1.60 Il matrimonio inaspettato (1779 Kammenïy Ostrov) [La contadina di spirito]
- R 1.61 La finta amante (5.6.1780 Mogilev) [Camiletta]
- R 1.62 Alcide al bivio (6.12.1780 St. Petersburg, Hermitage)
- R 1.63 La serva padrona (10?.9.1781 Tsarskoye Selo)
- Il duello comico (1782 Tsarskoye Selo) [rev. Il duello]
- R 1.64 Il barbiere di Siviglia, ovvero La precauzione inutile (26.9.1782 St. Petersburg)
- R 1.65 Il mondo della luna (1782 Kammenïy Ostrov)
- R 1.66 Il re Teodoro in Venezia (23.8.1784 Vienna, Burg)
- R 1.67 Antigono (12.10.1785 Naples, Teatro di S Carlo)
- R 1.68 L'amor ingegnoso, o sia La giovane scaltra (carnival 1785 Padua)
- R 1.69 La grotta di Trofonio (12.1785 Naples, Teatro dei Fiorentini)
- R 1.70 Olimpiade (20.1.1786 Naples, Teatro di S Carlo)
- R 1.71 Le gare generose (spring 1786 Naples, Teatro dei Fiorentini) [Gli schiavi per amore; Le bon maître, ou L'esclave par amour]
- R 1.72 Pirro (12.1.1787 Naples, Teatro di S Carlo)
- Il barbiere di Siviglia, ovvero La precauzione inutile [rev] (1787 Naples, Teatro dei Fiorentini)
- R 1.73 Giunone e Lucina (8.9.1787 Naples, Teatro di S Carlo)
- R 1.74 La modista raggiratrice (autumn 1787 Naples, Teatro dei Fiorentini) [La scuffiara amante, o sia Il maestro di scuola napolitano; La scuffiara raggiratrice]
- R 1.75 Fedra (1.1.1788 Naples, Teatro di S Carlo)
- R 1.76 L'amor contrastato (carnival 1789 Naples, Teatro dei Fiorentini) [L'amor contrastato o sia La molinarella]
- R 1.77 Catone in Utica (5.2.1789 Naples, Teatro di S Carlo)
- R 1.78 Nina, o sia La pazza per amore (25.6.1789 Caserta)
- R 1.79 I zingari in fiera (21.11.1789 Naples, Teatro dei Fiorentini)
- R 1.80 Le vane gelosie (spring 1790 Naples, Teatro dei Fiorentini)
- R 1.81 Zenobia in Palmira (30.5.1790 Naples, Teatro di S Carlo)
- La molinara (1790 Vienna) [rev. L'amor contrastato]
- Nina, o sia La pazza per amore [rev] (1790 Naples, Teatro dei Fiorentini)
- R 1.82 Ipermestra (6.1791 Padua)
- R 1.83 La locanda (16.6.1791 London Pantheon) [La locanda di falcone; Lo stambo in Berlina]
- R 1.84 I giuochi d'Agrigento (16.5.1792 Venice, Fenice)
- Il fanatico in Berlina (1792 Naples, Teatro dei Fiorentini) [rev. La locanda]
- R 1.85 Il ritorno d'Idomeneo in Creta (autumn 1792 Perugia) – lost
- R 1.86 Elfrida (4.11.1792 Naples, Teatro di S Carlo) [Adevolto]
- R 1.87 Elvira (12.1.1794 Naples, Teatro di S Carlo)
- R 1.88 Didone abbandonata (4.11.1794 Naples, Teatro di S Carlo)
- Nina, o sia La pazza per amore [rev 2] (1795 Naples, Teatro dei Fiorentini)
- Chi la dura la vince (9.6.1797 Milan S)
- R 1.89 La Daunia felice (26.6.1797 Foggia, Palazzo Dogana)
- R 1.90 Andromaca (4.11.1797 Naples, Teatro di S Carlo)
- R 1.91 L'inganno felice (1798 Naples, Teatro dei Fiorentini)
- R 1.92 L'isola disabitata (3.7.1799, Lisbon) – lost
- R 1.93 La Pace
- R 1.94 Proserpine (28.3.1803 Paris, Opéra)
- R 1.95 Elisa (19.3.1807 Naples, Teatro di S Carlo) [+ Mayr]
- R 1.96 I pittagorici (19.3.1808 Naples, Teatro di S Carlo)

== Secular cantatas ==
- R 2.01 – L'Ebone (lost)
- R 2.02 – La sorpresa delli Dei (lost)
- R 2.03 – 2 Notturni
- R 2.04 – La Partenza
- R 2.05 – La Libertà e Palinodia a Nice
- R 2.06 – Il Ritorno di Perseo
- R 2.07 – Amor vendicato
- R 2.08 – Il Genio Poetico Appagato
- R 2.09 – Cantata epitalamica (lost)
- R 2.10 – Canone a 4 voci
- R 2.11 – Le nozze di Silvio e Clori
- R 2.12 – La Volontaria
- R 2.13 – Il mio bene, il mio tesoro
- R 2.14 – Birthday Cantata for Prince Felice of Lucca
- R 2.15 – Tirsi a Fille
- R 2.16 – Fille a Tirsi
- R 2.17 – La Lontananza di Tirsi
- R 2.18 – La scusa
- R 2.19 – Riede omai la nuova aurora
- R 2.20 – 3 Notturni for 2 sopranos

== Oratorios, passions and sacred cantatas ==
- R 3.01 – Jephte sacrificium (lost)
- R 3.02 – La Passione di Nostro Signor Gesù Cristo
- R 3.03 – Passio secundum Mattheum
- R 3.04 – Passio di San Giovanni
- R 3.05 – Il transito di San Luigi Gansaga
- R 3.06 – Cantata fatta in occasione della transalazione del sangue di S. Gennaro
- R 3.07 – Baldassare
- R 3.08 – Cantata per la Sollenit‡ del SS. Corpo di Cristo
- R 3.09 – Cantata per la transalazione del sangue del glorioso martire S. Gennaro
- R 3.10 – Il fonte prodigioso di Orebre (lost)
- R 3.11 – Passio per la domenica delle Palme
- R 3.12 – Passio per il venerdi Santo

== Sacred music for rulers' chapels ==
Works composed for Napoleon's or King Joseph's chapels.

- R 4.01 – Virgam virtutis tuae in F major
- R 4.02 – Mass in F major
- R 4.03 – Absit sonitus tubae in D major
- R 4.04 – Mass in A major
- R 4.05 – Veni ferox, veni in G minor
- R 4.06 – Mass in C major
- R 4.07 – Splendete o coeli in G major
- R 4.08 – Mass in G major
- R 4.09 – Coeli stella amica in E♭ major
- R 4.10 – Mass in F major
- R 4.11 – Non est in vita amara in C major
- R 4.12 – Mass in B♭ major
- R 4.13 – Messa in Pastorale per il Natale in G major
- R 4.14 – Mass for Passion and Palm Sundays in F major
- R 4.15 – Veni sancte spiritus in E♭ major
- R 4.16 – Mass for the coronation of Napoleon I in B♭ major
- R 4.17 – Deh resplende o clara stella in D major
- R 4.18 – Gratiae sint Deo devotae in E♭ major
- R 4.19 – Splendete o coeli in G major
- R 4.20 – Sitibundi desolati in D minor
- R 4.21 – Alma fax et casti in E♭ major
- R 4.22 – Mass in D major
- R 4.23 – Ne lucem Bene in B♭ major
- R 4.24 – Altas Olympi fores in A major
- R 4.25 – Rosae lux e coelo in A major
- R 4.26 – Mass in F major
- R 4.27 – Vivat Deus in C major
- R 4.28 – Si mare ferox murmurat in F major
- R 4.29 – Coeli stella amica in E♭ major
- R 4.30 – Non est in vita amara in C major
- R 4.31 – Heu nos jam velum in E♭ major
- R 4.32 – Quis est? in C major
- R 4.33 – Mass in C major
- R 4.34 – Absit sonitus tubae in D major
- R 4.35 – In tuo beato ardore in G major
- R 4.36 – O mortales summo ardore in D major
- R 4.37 – Mass in D major
- R 4.38 – Mass for the Assumption of the Blessed Virgin Mary in G major (1809)
- R 4.39 – Sagro trattenimento musicale in B♭ major
- R 4.40 – Sagro componimento musicale in C major
- R 4.41 – Sagro componimento musicale in G major
- R 4.42 – Mass for the Assumption of the Blessed Virgin Mary in G major (1811)
- R 4.43 – Mass in E♭ major
- R 4.44 – Mass for the Assumption of the Blessed Virgin Mary in C major
- R 4.45 – Mass in B♭ major
- R 4.46 – Te Deum breve in G major
- R 4.47 – Laudate pueri in E minor
- R 4.48 – Salvum fac Domine in B♭ major

== Masses (other than those for rulers' chapels) ==
- R 5.01 – Missa Defunctorum in C minor
- R 5.02 – Mass in G major
- R 5.03 – Mass in D major
- R 5.04 – Mass in F major
- R 5.05 – Mass in D major
- R 5.06 – Mass in B♭ major
- R 5.07 – Agnus Dei in G major
- R 5.08 – Mass in F major
- R 5.09 – Mass in C major
- R 5.10 – Mass in F major
- R 5.11 – Mass in C major (doubtful)

== Pieces for the Mass Ordinary ==
- R 5.51 – Introit, offertory and communion for the mass in F major
- R 5.52 – Introit, kyrie and offertory
- R 5.53 – Introit, gradual, offertory, post-communion and responsory
- R 5.54 – Gradual: Omnes de Saba venient in G major
- R 5.55 – Offertory: Te gloriosus chorus in D major

== Psalms, hymns or antiphons used during Mass ==
- R 5.56 – Veni sancte spiritus in D major
- R 5.57 – Exsulta jam cor meum in D major
- R 5.58 – Stabat Mater del Pergolese in C minor
- R 5.59 – Libera me Domine in D minor
- R 5.60 – Caro mea vere est cibus in B♭ major
- R 5.61 – Benedictus Rex in B♭ major

== Psalms, canticles, hymns or antiphons ==
- R 6.01 – Te Deum in B♭ major
- R 6.02 – Te Deum in C major
- R 6.03 – Hymn: O salutaris hostia in A major
- R 6.04 – Dixit Dominus in A major
- R 6.05 – Antiphon: Domine ad adjuvandum in F major
- R 6.06 – Dixit Dominus in F major
- R 6.07 – Antiphon: Domine ad adjuvandum in G major
- R 6.08 – Dixit Dominus in C major
- R 6.09 – Dixit Dominus in D major
- R 6.10 – Dixit Dominus in G major
- R 6.11 – Dixit Dominus in D major
- R 6.12 – Dixit Dominus in G major
- R 6.13 – Psalm: Confitebor tibi in A major
- R 6.14 – Psalm: Laudate pueri in E♭ major
- R 6.15 – Psalm: Laudate pueri in C major
- R 6.16 – Psalm: Laudate pueri in C major
- R 6.17 – Psalm: Laetatus sum in D minor
- R 6.18 – Psalm: Magnificat in C major
- R 6.19 – Psalm: Magnificat in G major
- R 6.20 – Litany in G major
- R 6.21 – Responsoria Nativitatis Domini in E minor
- R 6.22 – Responsori per la settimana santa
- R 6.23 – Responsori per Giovedi Santo
- R 6.24 – Responsori per Venerdi Santo
- R 6.25 – Lamentazione prima in C major
- R 6.26 – Lamentazione seconda in G major
- R 6.26 – Lamentazione terza in F major
- R 6.28 – Lezione per la sera del Giovedi Santo
- R 6.29 – Christus factus est in A minor
- R 6.30 – Miserere a 5 in D minor
- R 6.31 – Hymn: Pange lingua in C minor
- R 6.32 – Hymn: Tantum ergo in A major
- R 6.33 – 3 Tantum ergo for soprano
- R 6.34 – Hymn: Tantum ergo in C major
- R 6.35 – Antiphon: Benedicat in F major
- R 6.36 – Antiphon: Regina coeli in B♭ major
- R 6.37 – Antiphon: Salve Regina in E♭ major
- R 6.38 – Antiphon: Ave maris stella in F major

== Motets ==
(to be completed)

- R 7.01 – Motet: Astra coeli in C major
- R 7.02 – Motet: O luminosa aurora in G major
- R 7.03 – Motet: In corde intrepido in C major
- R 7.04 – Motet: Mille furis in C major
- R 7.05 – Motet: Absit sonitus in D major

== Instrumental works ==
- R 8.01 – String Quartet No. 1 in C major
- R 8.02 – String Quartet No. 2 in A major
- R 8.03 – String Quartet No. 3 in D major
- R 8.04 – String Quartet No. 4 in E♭ major
- R 8.05 – String Quartet No. 5 in E flat major
- R 8.06 – String Quartet No. 6 in C major
- R 8.07 – String Quartet No. 7 in E♭ major
- R 8.08 – String Quartet No. 8 in G major
- R 8.09 – String Quartet No. 9 in A major
- R 8.10 – Keyboard Concerto No. 1 in C major
- R 8.11 – Keyboard Concerto No. 2 in F major
- R 8.12 – 4 Divertimenti for winds in E♭ major
- R 8.13 – 12 Divertimenti for winds
- R 8.14 – Collection of rondos and capriccios for keyboard
- R 8.15 – Keyboard Concerto No. 3 in A major
- R 8.16 – Keyboard Concerto No. 4 in G minor
- R 8.17 – Keyboard Concerto No. 5 in D major
- R 8.18 – Keyboard Concerto No. 6 in B♭ major
- R 8.19 – Keyboard Concerto No. 7 in A major
- R 8.20 – Keyboard Concerto No. 8 in C major
- R 8.21 – Violin Sonata in E major
- R 8.22 – Marche funèbre pour le Général Hoche in C minor
- R 8.23 – Andante for horn and harp in C major
- R 8.24 – 3 Pieces for Military Band
- R 8.25 – Symphony in C major

== Works of doubtful authenticity ==
- R E.02 – Sinfonia in E♭ major
- R E.06 – Flute Quartet Op. 23 No. 2 in D major
- R E.07 – Flute Quartet Op. 23 No. 5 in G major
- R E.08 – Flute Quartet Op. 23 No. 4 in G major
- R E.09 – Flute Quartet Op. 23 No. 1 in C major
- R E.10 – Flute Quartet Op. 23 No. 3 in E minor
- R E.11 – Flute Quartet Op. 23 No. 6 in G major
- R E.13 – Marche du Premier Consul in B♭ major
- R E.14 – Mandolin concerto in E♭ major
- R E.15 – Mandolin concerto in C major
- R E.16 – Mandolin concerto in G major

== Educational treatises ==
- Regole per bene accompagnare il partimento o sia il basso fondamentale sopra il Cembalo
- 298 Disposizione over partimenti by Giovanni Paisiello, in two large handwritten volumes. Presumably written by his student in composition Auguste Louis de Talleyrand. The name 'Taleyrand' appears on the inside of the cover of volume 2. Besides the 45 partimenti from Paisiello's Regole per bene accompagnare, the Taleyrand dispositions contain 41 partimenti that had not been previously known. These volumes are preserved in the Bibliothèque Nationale de France (F-Pn Rés Vmb Ms. 10/1 and 10/2).

== Disputed works ==
- Inno al Re, disputed between Paisiello and Pietro Pisani

== Sources ==
- Robinson, Michael F.; Hofmann, Ulrike (1991). Giovanni Paisiello, a Thematic Catalogue of His Works: Dramatic works. Pendragon Press. ISBN 978-0-918728-75-3.
