= Alessandro Pepoli =

Italian writer (1757–1796)

Alessandro Pepoli (1 October 1757 – 12 December 1796), was an Italian librettist and writer of tragedies.

== Biography ==
Alessandro Ercole Pepoli was born in Venice on 1 October 1757. His father was the Bolognese count and senator Cornelio Pepoli. From 1770 to 1775 he was educated under a private tutor, Don Benedetto Macarani. When his father died in 1777 he inherited from him the positions of Bolognese senator, Venetian patrician and Roman nobleman.

Pepoli sought to be considered a literary rival to Italian dramatist and poet Vittorio Alfieri, often writing his own takes on topics previously addressed by Alfieri. Styling himself as a champion of liberty, He wrote an essay on freedom, Saggio di libertà (1783, Geneva) advocating political reform. His 50-page essay Lettera ad un uomo ragionevole sul melodramma detto serio (1789) was an outspoken critique of the state of opera seria who blamed the decline of the genre on the romantic excesses of Metastasio and advocated for a return to the principles of Greek drama by integrating ballets and choruses and removing amorous schemes and machinations.

Other noted works include:

- Anna Bolena, a libretto recounting the life of Anne Boleyn, the second wife of England's King Henry VIII. Similar treatments were done in the same period by Felice Romani (Anna Bolena) and Ippolito Pindemonte (Enrico VIII ossia Anna Bolena).
- A libretto for an opera by Giovanni Paisiello entitled I giuochi d'Agrigento with which the theater, La Fenice, was inaugurated on 16 May 1792.
- A six-page summary translation of John Milton's Paradise Lost, Prospetto del "Paradiso Perduto" di Giovanni Milton Tradotto in versi sciolti da Alessandro Pepoli, printed in Venice in 1795.
- A tragedy Agamennone published in Venice in 1794 and rival of the tragedy with the same subject of Alfieri

Pepoli died in Florence on 2 December 1796. The cause was pneumonia.

== See also ==
- List of Italian writers
- List of playwrights
- List of people from Venice
