= I giuochi d'Agrigento =

I giuochi d'Agrigento (The Games of Akragas) is an opera by Giovanni Paisiello to a libretto by Count Alessandro Pepoli with which the rebuilt La Fenice in Venice was inaugurated on 16 May 1792. The castrato Gasparo Pacchierotti lead the cast. The plot, inspired in part by Metastasio's L'Olimpiade, is set against the games at ancient Agrigento on Sicily's southwest shore.

== Recordings ==
- 2008 Eraclide (Marcello Nardis), Clearco (Razek François Bitar), Aspasia (Maria Laura Martonana), Egesta (Mara Lanfranchi), Cleone (Vincenzo Taormina), Filosseno (Nicola Amodio), Elpenore (Vladimer Mebonia), Deifile (Dolores Carlucci). Coro Slovacco di Bratislava. Orchestra Internazionale d'Italia, Giovanni Battista Rigon (cond.) Dynamic 531/1-2 [2CDs]
