= Akragas (metropolis) =

Ancient Greek city state in Sicily

- Ἀκράγας (Ancient Greek)
- Temple of Concordia, Agrigento, Sicily
- Interactive map of Akragas
- Periods: Classical Antiquity
- Cultures: Greek
- Location: Agrigento, Sicily
- Region: Sicily, italy

History
- Built: 580 BCE
- Abandoned: 406 BCE, Rebuilt: 338 BCE

Akragas (Ancient Greek: Ἀκράγας) was an Ancient greek city state on the southern coast of Sicily, renowned for its wealth, power, and monumental architecture in the classical Mediterranean world. Its remains are preserved in the archaeological area known as the Valle dei Templi, in the modern city of Agrigento in Italy. Founded around 580 BCE by Greek colonists from Gela, Akragas quickly grew into one of the most important cities of Magna Graecia, benefiting from fertile lands and strategic access to trade routes. By the 5th century BCE, it had become a cultural and economic center, famed for its grand temples and prosperity. The city was conquered and destroyed by the Carthaginians in 406 BCE, however it was rebuilt by Greeks in 338 BCE.

At its height, Akragas was celebrated for both its intellectual life and its reputation for prosperity, famously described by ancient writer Plato as a place where people lived “as if they would die tomorrow, and built as if they would live forever.” The city was the birthplace of the philosopher Empedocles, and its rulers, including the tyrant Theron, sponsored large-scale building projects that left a lasting architectural legacy. Among these were the impressive Doric temples, many of which still stand today as some of the best-preserved examples of Greek architecture outside mainland Greece.

== History ==
=== Ancient history ===
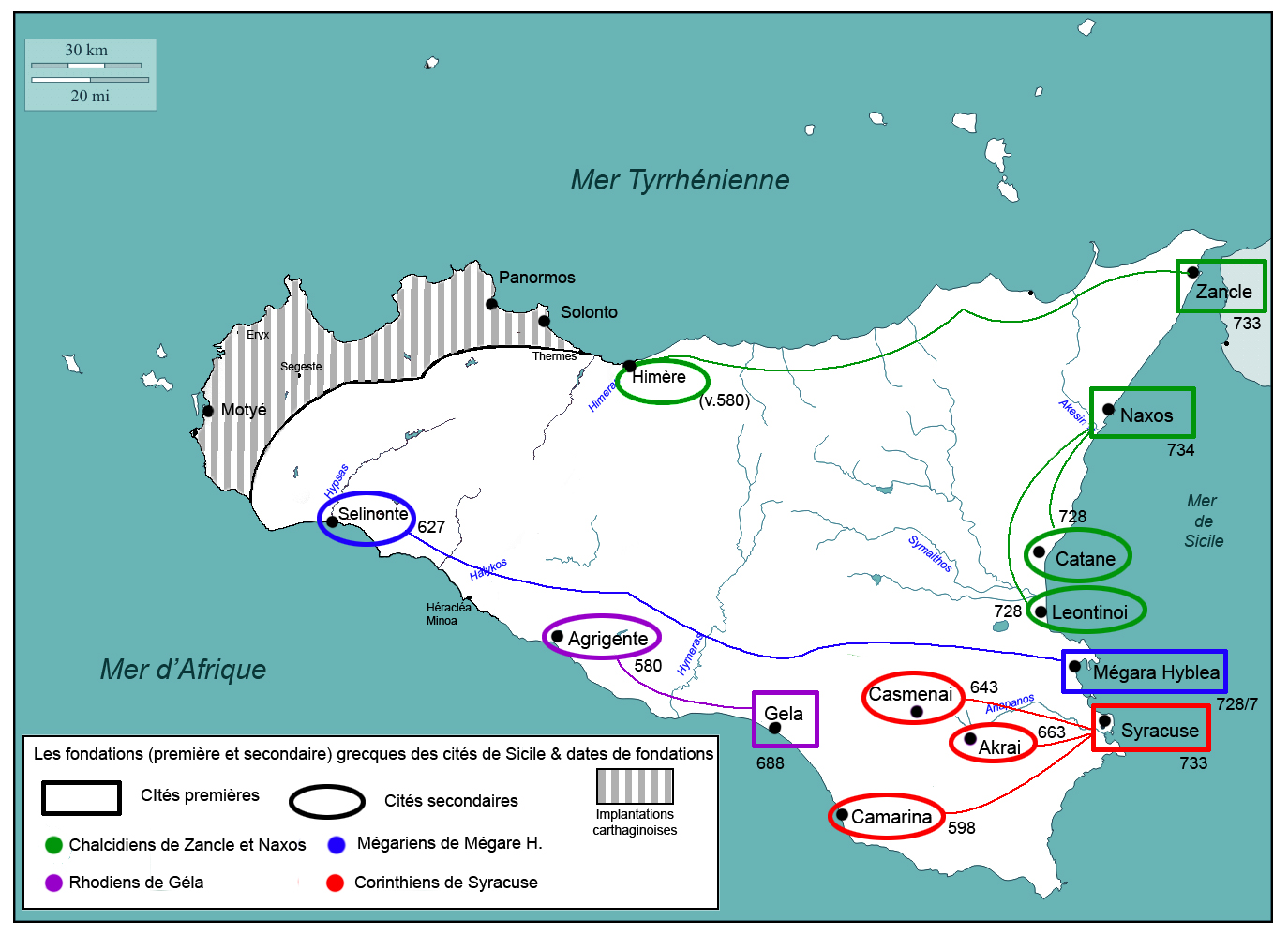
First Greek settlements & dates

Akragas was founded on a plateau overlooking the sea, with two nearby rivers, the Hypsas and the Acragas, after which the settlement was originally named. A ridge, which offered a degree of natural fortification, links a hill to the north, called Colle di Girgenti, with another, called Rupe Atenea, to the east. According to Thucydides, it was founded around 582–580 BC by Greek colonists from Gela in eastern Sicily, with further colonists from Crete and Rhodes. The founders (oikistai) of the new city were Aristonous and Pystilus. It was the last of the major Greek colonies in Sicily to be founded.

=== Archaic period ===
The territory under Akragas's control expanded to encompass the region between the Platani and Salso rivers, extending deep into the Sicilian interior. Greek literary sources attribute this growth to a series of military campaigns; however, archaeological evidence suggests that it was instead a gradual and long-term process, reaching its height only in the early fifth century BCE. Comparable patterns of territorial expansion are attested among other Greek settlements in Sicily during this period. Excavations at indigenous Sican sites: including Monte Sabbucina, Gibil Gabib, Vassallaggi, Sant'Angelo Muxaro, and Mussomeli, reveal clear indications of cultural interaction, particularly the adoption of Greek material culture and practices. The extent to which this expansion relied on coercion as opposed to peaceful exchange and acculturation remains a subject of scholarly debate.

This territorial consolidation provided arable land for Greek settlers, as well as a labor force likely composed in part of subjugated indigenous populations. It also secured control over key inland routes, most notably the overland corridor linking Akragas to Himera on Sicily's northern coast. This route constituted a major artery between the Straits of Sicily and the Tyrrhenian Sea, and Akragas's dominance over it was a crucial factor in its economic prosperity during the sixth and fifth centuries BCE. Such wealth became proverbial in antiquity; according to Plato, the inhabitants “built as if they would live forever, yet ate as if each day were their last.” Reflecting this affluence, Akragas was among the earliest Sicilian cities to mint its own coinage, beginning around 520 BCE.

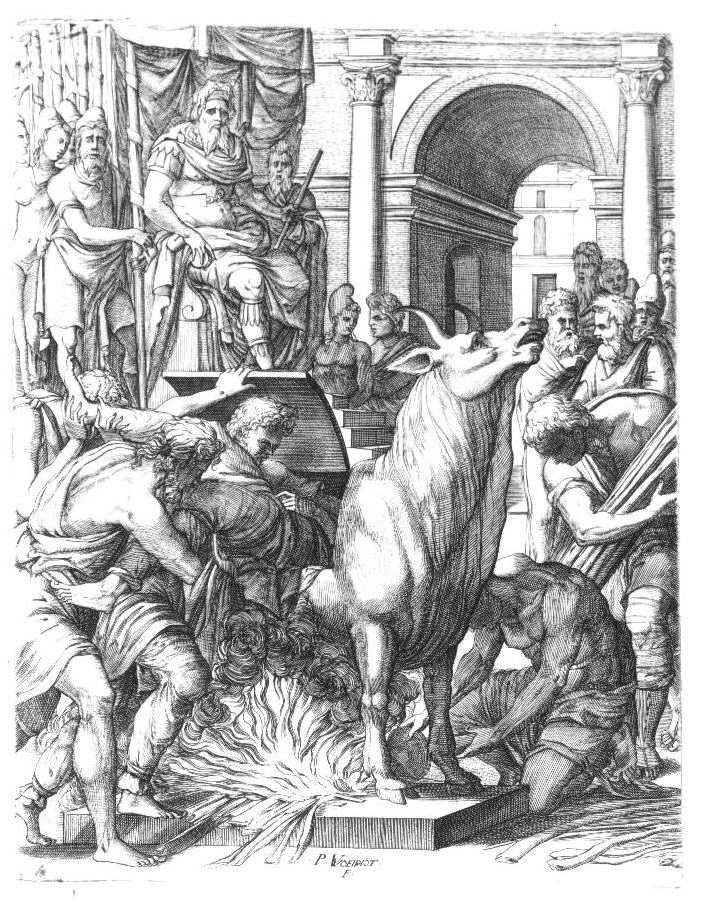
Phalaris condemning the sculptor Perillus to the Bronze Bull, after Baldassare Peruzzi

Around 570 BCE, the city came under the rule of Phalaris, a semi-legendary figure later remembered as the archetypal tyrant. Ancient sources portray him as cruel and despotic, most famously alleging that he executed his enemies within a bronze bull. These same traditions associate his reign with territorial expansion, though such claims are likely retrospective embellishments. Phalaris remained in power until approximately 550 BCE. Thereafter, the political history of Akragas in the later sixth century BCE is obscure, with only the names of two leaders, Alcamenes and Alcander, preserved in the sources.

During this same period, Akragas continued to expand westward, bringing it into increasing competition with Selinus, the nearest Greek colony to the west. In the mid-sixth century BCE, the Selinuntines established the settlement of Heraclea Minoa at the mouth of the Platani River, effectively marking a frontier between the two powers. This balance, however, proved temporary: around 500 BCE, Akragas succeeded in capturing the site, further consolidating its regional dominance.

=== Period of the Tyrants ===
Around 488 BCE, Akragas came under the rule of Theron, a member of the influential Emmenid family, who established himself as tyrant during a period of intense political competition among the Greek cities of Sicily. Theron consolidated his position through a strategic alliance with Gelon, the Tyrant of Gela and later Syracuse, thereby aligning Akragas with one of the dominant military powers in the region. This alliance proved decisive in expanding Akragas's influence. Around 483 BCE, Theron launched a successful campaign against the nearby city of Himera, located on the northern coast of Sicily, and brought it under his control.

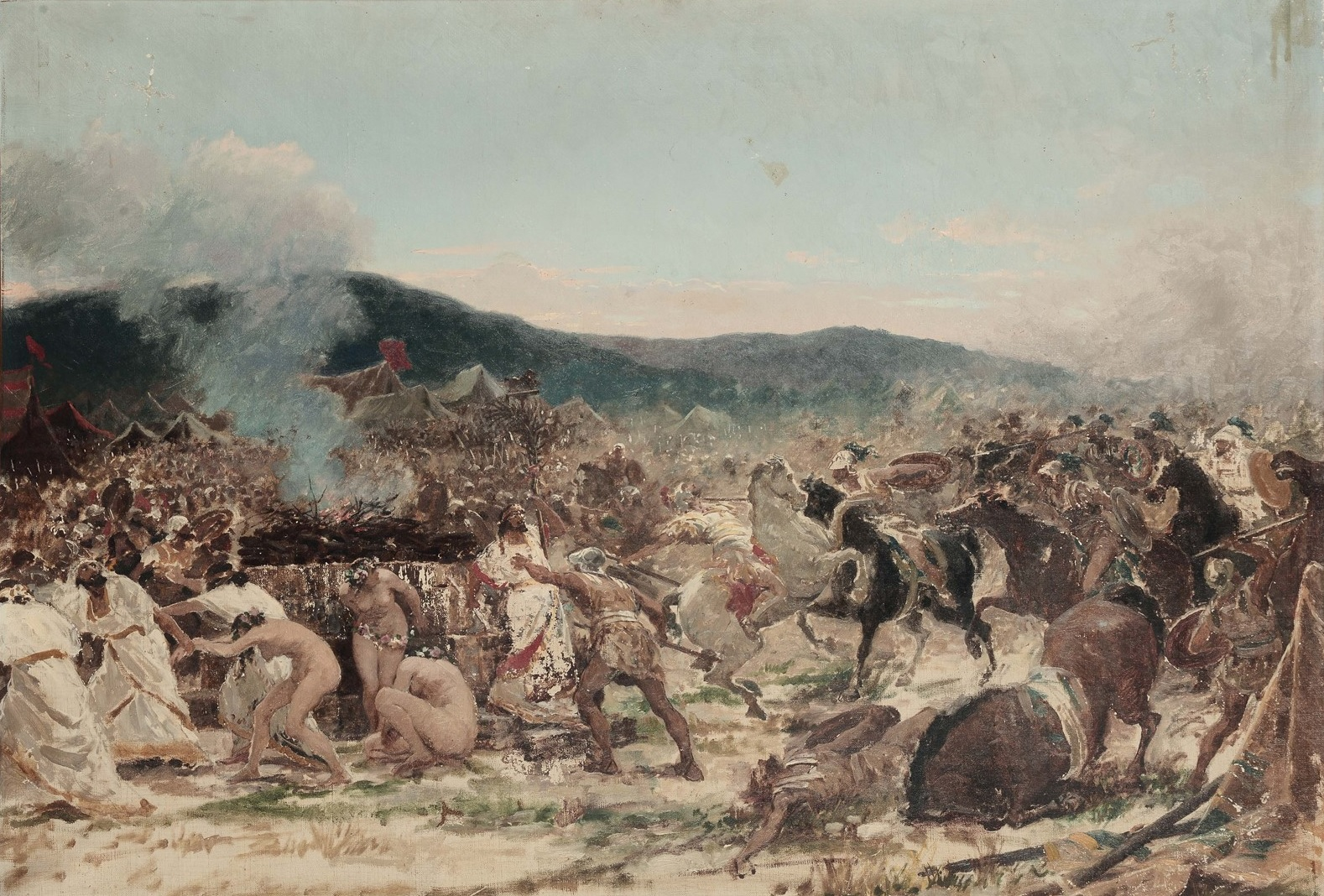
The Battle of Himera

The overthrow of Himera's ruler, Terillus, prompted a wider geopolitical crisis. Terillus sought assistance from his son-in-law, Anaxilas of Rhegium, as well as from the city of Selinus, and together they appealed to Carthage for intervention. In response, Carthaginian forces launched a large-scale invasion of Sicily in 480 BCE, marking a major episode in the early Greco-Punic conflicts. This campaign culminated in the decisive Greek victory at the Battle of Himera, where the combined forces of Theron and Gelon defeated the Carthaginian army. The outcome of this battle not only secured Himera under Akragantine control but also confirmed Akragas's dominance over a vast area of central Sicily, estimated at 3,500 square kilometers.

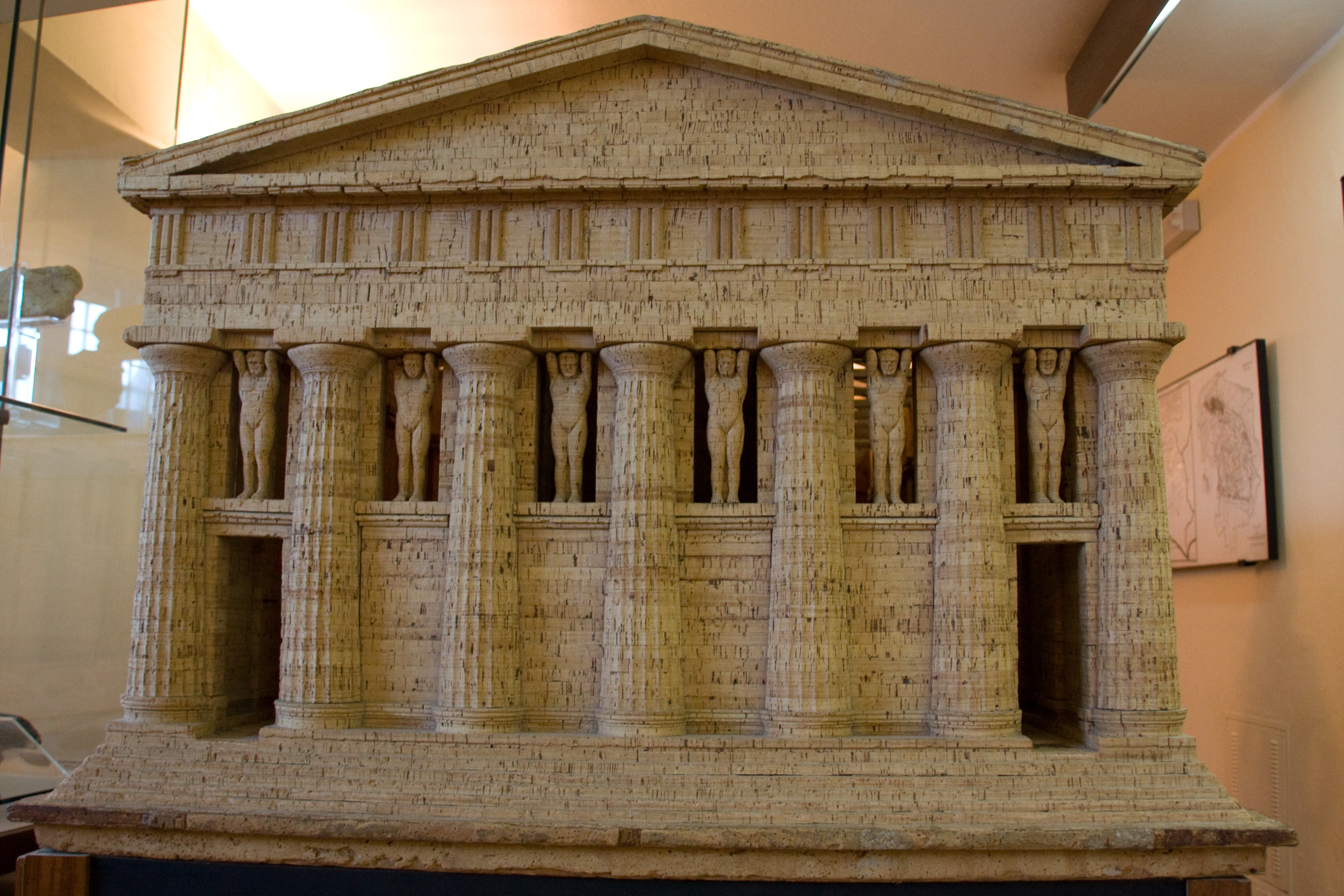
Model of the Temple of Olympian Zeus in the Archaeological Museum, Agrigento

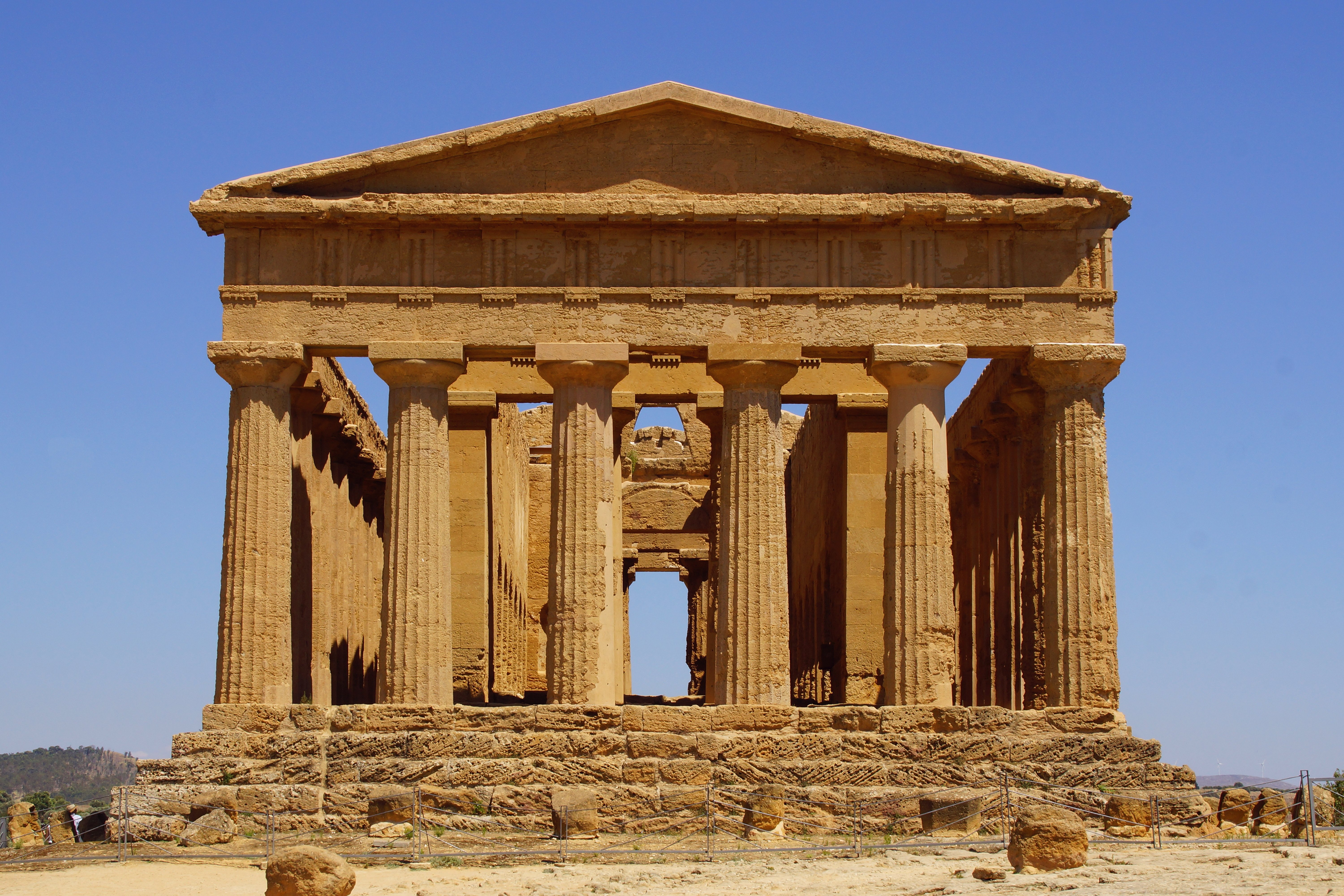
Valle dei Templi, built in triumph after the victory of the Battle of Himera

The decades surrounding this victory witnessed an extraordinary phase of monumental construction, particularly within the sacred precinct now known as the Valle dei Templi. Among the most ambitious projects was the Temple of Olympian Zeus, one of the largest temples ever conceived in the Greek world, along with the construction of the immense Kolymbethra reservoir. According to Diodorus Siculus, these works were undertaken to commemorate the victory at Himera and were carried out using war captives as forced labor. Archaeological evidence, however, indicates that this surge in construction had already begun prior to the battle and continued afterward. In addition, the city's fortifications were extensively rebuilt on a monumental scale during this period, further underscoring Akragas's wealth and strategic importance.

Theron also sought to enhance his prestige in the wider Greek world by participating in Panhellenic competitions. Victories achieved by his representatives at events such as the Olympic Games were celebrated in odes composed by poets including Pindar and Simonides of Ceos. These works not only commemorate individual successes but also provide valuable insight into the civic identity and ideology of Akragas.

Ancient literary traditions generally portray Theron as a capable and relatively moderate ruler. In contrast, his son and successor, Thrasydaeus, who assumed power in 472 BCE, is depicted as harsh and oppressive. His rule was short-lived: shortly after Theron's death, Hiero I of Syracuse, the brother and successor of Gelon, intervened militarily, defeated Thrasydaeus, and expelled him from power. According to literary sources, Akragas subsequently adopted a democratic constitution; in practice, however, political authority appears to have remained concentrated in the hands of a wealthy civic aristocracy.

=== Late Classical period ===
The period following the fall of the Emmenid tyranny is poorly documented and remains one of the more obscure phases in the political history of Akragas. After the expulsion of Thrasydaeus in 472 BCE, power is generally understood to have passed into the hands of an oligarchic governing body known in the literary tradition as “the Thousand” (Hoi Chilioi). This group appears to have represented a restricted civic elite, likely composed of wealthy landowners who governed the city for a limited period in the mid-fifth century BCE. Their rule was ultimately overthrown in an internal political upheaval, which ancient sources associate, at least in part, with the influence of the philosopher Empedocles. However, the extent of Empedocles’ involvement is highly uncertain, and many modern scholars regard this tradition as later embellishment rather than historical fact.

Shortly thereafter, Akragas became entangled in wider Sicilian conflicts involving both Greek and indigenous Sicel powers. In 451 BCE, Ducetius, the leader of a unified Sicel polity resisting Greek expansion into the interior of Sicily, invaded Akragantine territory and seized the outpost of Motyum. Although the Syracusan forces succeeded in defeating and capturing Ducetius in 450 BCE, they subsequently allowed him to go into exile rather than imposing severe punishment. This relatively lenient outcome provoked strong dissatisfaction in Akragas, leading the city to declare war on Syracuse.

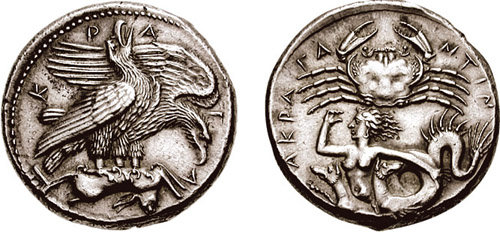
Tetradrachm of Akragas, 414-413 BC

The ensuing conflict culminated in a battle along the Salso River, in which the Akragantines suffered a decisive defeat. This outcome significantly altered the balance of power in Sicily, confirming the hegemony of Hiero I of Syracuse's successor state, Syracuse, as the dominant political force in the eastern part of the island. The consequences of this defeat were substantial for Akragas: its political influence was diminished, and the severity of the setback is reflected in the temporary cessation of its coinage production, which had previously been an important marker of its economic autonomy.

== Population ==
Ancient literary sources describe Akragas during this period as a city of exceptional size and prosperity. Diodorus Siculus reports a population of approximately 200,000 inhabitants, including 20,000 citizens, while Diogenes Laertius provides an even more exaggerated figure of 800,000. These numbers are widely regarded by modern scholarship as highly inflated, reflecting rhetorical or ideological exaggeration rather than reliable demographic data. Contemporary estimates based on archaeological and comparative evidence are considerably lower: Jos de Waele proposes a citizen body of approximately 16,000–18,000, while Franco de Angelis suggests a total population in the range of 30,000–40,000 inhabitants.

== Tensions with Carthage ==
Carthage had largely stayed out of Sicilian affairs for nearly seventy years after its defeat at Himera in 480 BCE. During this period, Greek cultural influence expanded steadily among the Elymians, Sikanian, and Sicel communities of Sicily. However, the Greek tyrannies of Syracuse and Akragas, once responsible for the victory at Himera, collapsed by around 460 BCE. This left the Greek cities politically fragmented and increasingly vulnerable, especially as they became involved in internal conflicts and also faced resistance from Sicel leader Ducetius.

The inactivity of Carthage regarding Sicily changed in 411 when the Ionian Greek (former Elymian) city Segesta clashed with the Dorian Greek city Selinus and got the worst of the conflict. Segesta then appealed to Carthage for aid. This appeal came at a time when the mainland Greek cities were locked in the Peloponnesian War, and Syracuse, an ally of Sparta, was not focused on Sicily. The Syracusan fleet was operating in the Aegean Sea, and Syracuse was in conflict with Naxos and Leontini, two Ionian Greek cities sympathetic to another Ionic city, Athens, the enemy of Sparta.

After deliberation, the Carthaginian Senate agreed to intervene. In 410 BCE, Carthage assembled a large expeditionary force under Hannibal Mago after diplomatic efforts to resolve the dispute between Segesta and Selinus failed. The Carthaginian army captured Selinus in 409 BCE and subsequently destroyed Himera. Despite this success, Syracuse and Akragas did not immediately engage Carthage. Instead, the Carthaginians withdrew with spoils and left garrisons in western Sicily. No peace treaty was concluded, leaving the conflict unresolved.

While the governments of Syracuse and Akragas took only preventive measures, Hermocrates, an exiled general of Syracuse, sought to take a more aggressive stance on the issue of Carthaginian aggression, hoping that his actions would enable him to return to Syracuse and assume a political position. He hired 2,000 mercenaries (1,000 of them former citizens of Himera) and five ships and then set up a base in the ruins of Selinus, building a wall for security around the acropolis. His force ultimately swelled to 6,000 men, (many former citizens of Selinus had joined him) and Hermocrates started to raid Punic territories at his discretion. He first defeated the men of Motya, then ravaged their land. His next target was the territory of "Golden Shell", the land around Panormus. In 407 BCE, the Greeks defeated the citizens of Panormus (killing 500 of them) and plundered at will, retiring to Selinus with their spoils. These activities gained Hermocrates fame and sympathy with Sicilian Greeks, but no recall from Syracuse.

Hermocrates then collected the bones of the Greek dead left unburied at Himera and sent them over to Syracuse for burial, an act that further enhanced his reputation among the Greeks (and brought about the downfall of Diocles, the Syracusan leader defeated at Himera and who had actually left the bones unburied) but did not end his exile from Syracuse. The general finally tried to stage a coup in Syracuse, where he died in a street fight. Syracuse and Akragas did not neglect their defences during the activities of Hermocrates. Akragas, expecting to be the first target of any Carthaginian retaliation, set about expanding its army while Syracuse started to expand its fleet. The walls of both the cities were also kept in repair.

=== Greek preparations ===
Syracuse and Akragas took speedy action to prepare for the expected Punic response after the downfall of Hermocrates. Syracuse appealed to the cities of Magna Graecia and even Sparta for help, while a general named Daphnaeus was elected to lead the Syracusan war effort. An officer named Dionysius, who had been a cohort of the fallen Hermocrates, was also elected as part of the army command staff. The Greeks started gathering an army at Syracuse which included Greeks from Camarina, Gela, Messene, and Italy in addition to mercenaries, but Sparta was unable to send aid at this time. Akragas hired the Spartan general Dexippus with a band of 1,500 hoplites and some Campanian mercenaries (previously serving under Hannibal Mago at Himera) to augment their force of 10,000 troops. Syracuse posted a fleet of forty triremes at Eryx to watch for the movement of the Punic navy.

The Carthaginian Senate had offered the command of the coming expedition to Hannibal Mago (the “Greek Hater”), who at first refused the position pleading advanced age. When his kinsman Himilco was appointed as his deputy, Hannibal set about making preparations in earnest. Aside from Carthaginian citizens, troops were levied from Africa, Spain, and Italy, so an army of 120,000 men (probably exaggerated; around 60,000 is closer to the truth) and a fleet of 120 triremes and 1,000 transports were made ready by the Spring of 406 BCE. Carthage doubled the numbers of triremes (only 60 triremes had escorted the expeditions of 480 and 409) because the Syracusan navy had returned from mainland Greece, posing a severe threat to the Carthaginian expedition.

Before the main invasion, Carthage sent an advance naval squadron to Sicily, which clashed with the Greek fleet near Eryx and suffered losses. The main Carthaginian fleet then advanced with a strong escort, forcing the Greek ships to withdraw. The expedition landed successfully near Motya, marking the beginning of the renewed large-scale Carthaginian campaign.

== Siege of Akragas (406–405 BCE) ==
The advance was unopposed by the Greeks when they marched towards Akragas in the early summer of 406 BC. Hannibal left his warships at Motya before setting out for Akragas. The citizens of Akragas, not wanting to face the Carthaginians by themselves or contribute to their spoils, had gathered the harvest and the entire population (some 200,000 people) within the city as part of their preparations. Hannibal began preparation for the siege in earnest once his army reached Akragas. Two fortified camps were built, one camp (protected by a ditch and palisade) on the western side of Akragas on the right bank of river Hypsas, the other on the left bank of the river Akragas, housing about a third of the army, on the east side of the city, blocking the roads to Gela. The Akragans did not oppose these activities, but stayed within their city.

Hannibal offered terms to the city before commencing hostilities: Akragas would either become an ally of Carthage or stay neutral while Carthage dealt with the other Greeks in Sicily. Both conditions were rejected by the Akragan government. The entire male population of the city was armed and posted on the walls, the mercenaries were placed on the hill of Athena (some argue they were posted at the acropolis), and some troops were placed in reserve to plug any gaps created by the Carthaginians on the city walls. After the final preparations were made, the Greeks awaited the Carthaginian assault.

Hannibal decided not to build circumvallation walls but to starve the Greeks into submission. The position of the city on high ground made it difficult to assault directly or storm from several directions at once. Hannibal chose to use two siege towers to assault one of the gates on the west side of the city. The Carthaginians managed to inflict casualties on the defenders, but after an all-day struggle, could not force the gate. At night the Greeks made a sortie and burnt the towers down. Hannibal then ordered his soldiers to tear down the tombs and other buildings outside the walls to make siege ramps, so any part of the city wall could be assaulted by siege engines. The Punic soldiers were uneasy about desecrating tombs, and they panicked when a plague broke out in the Carthaginian camps. The Carthaginians lost many men, including Hannibal himself.

=== Siege fails ===
Himilco now assumed command of the Punic army. His first duty was to restore the morale of his soldiers, which he did by sacrificing a child to the god the Greeks associated with Cronos and some animals to the sea by drowning them, after putting a stop to the tomb-destroying activities. Then he continued building siege ramps using the materials already collected and also dammed the Hypsas River, (the course of which made it act as a moat for Akragas), for gaining better access to the city.

At this point Daphnaeus of Syracuse arrived with 30,000 hoplites and 5,000 cavalry to break the siege, accompanied by thirty triremes. The Greek army may have been larger as light troops are not included in the tally. Himilco led the mercenaries in the eastern camp to intercept this army, while the main army stayed in their camp and kept the garrison of Akragas in check. A battle was joined somewhere on the right bank of the River Himera (the actual battle site is unidentified and subject to debate). The Punic army at first managed to create difficulties for the Italian Greeks stationed on the left of the Greek battle line, but the Syracusan right wing scattered their Punic counterparts before the Carthaginians gained any decisive advantage. The Greeks ultimately managed to defeat the Carthaginians in a hotly contested battle. The Punic army fled the field leaving almost 6,000 dead behind. Daphnaeus chose to regroup his soldiers before giving chase.

As the fleeing Carthaginians retreated past Akragas, the city dwellers clamored to be led out to attack the enemy, which their generals (including the Spartan Dexippus), refused to do, fearing a repeat of the Himera debacle of 409 BCE. The victory of the Syracusan-led army, which had not pursued the retreating Carthaginians also fearing a counterattack, had lifted the siege of the city, and the eastern camp of the Carthaginian army had fallen into Greek hands. This positioned the Greeks favorably against the Punic army, with the initiative firmly in their hands.

=== Himilco triumphs ===
The Carthaginians learned of the approach of a supply convoy from Syracuse. Himilco managed to convince the mercenaries to stay put for a few more days, by giving them the gold/silver drinking cups of the Carthaginian citizens, then sent word to the Carthaginian fleet to sortie from Motya/Panormus. The Carthaginian fleet of forty ships arrived from the West, and managed to surprise the escorting Syracusan fleet, which may have grown complacent due to their command of the sea, and sank eight Greek triremes escorting the grain ships. When the surviving Greek triremes beached themselves, the Carthaginian flotilla captured the entire convoy. This solved the supply problems for Himilco, and caused the Greeks in turn to face the threat of starvation.

=== Greeks leave the city ===
The capture of the convoy caused rumors of impending food shortage at Akragas, where the population may not have planted any crops because of the ongoing conflict. Himilco secretly bribed the Campanian mercenaries, who deserted Akragas after complaining of food shortages. When the Akragan authorities found the remaining stocks of food inadequate to feed the whole Greek army, the Greek contingent from Magna Graecia also left Akragas.

The rapidly dwindling food stocks persuaded the Akragan authorities to abandon the city. In mid-December, 40,000 people along with the army, marched east for Gela, carrying whatever valuables they could out of the city. The city being abandoned, only the sick, the old and some diehards stayed behind in Akragas. Himilco had little difficulty taking and pillaging the nearly empty city the following morning, putting to sword any who resisted. The siege had lasted for eight months.

== Sack and destruction of Akragas ==
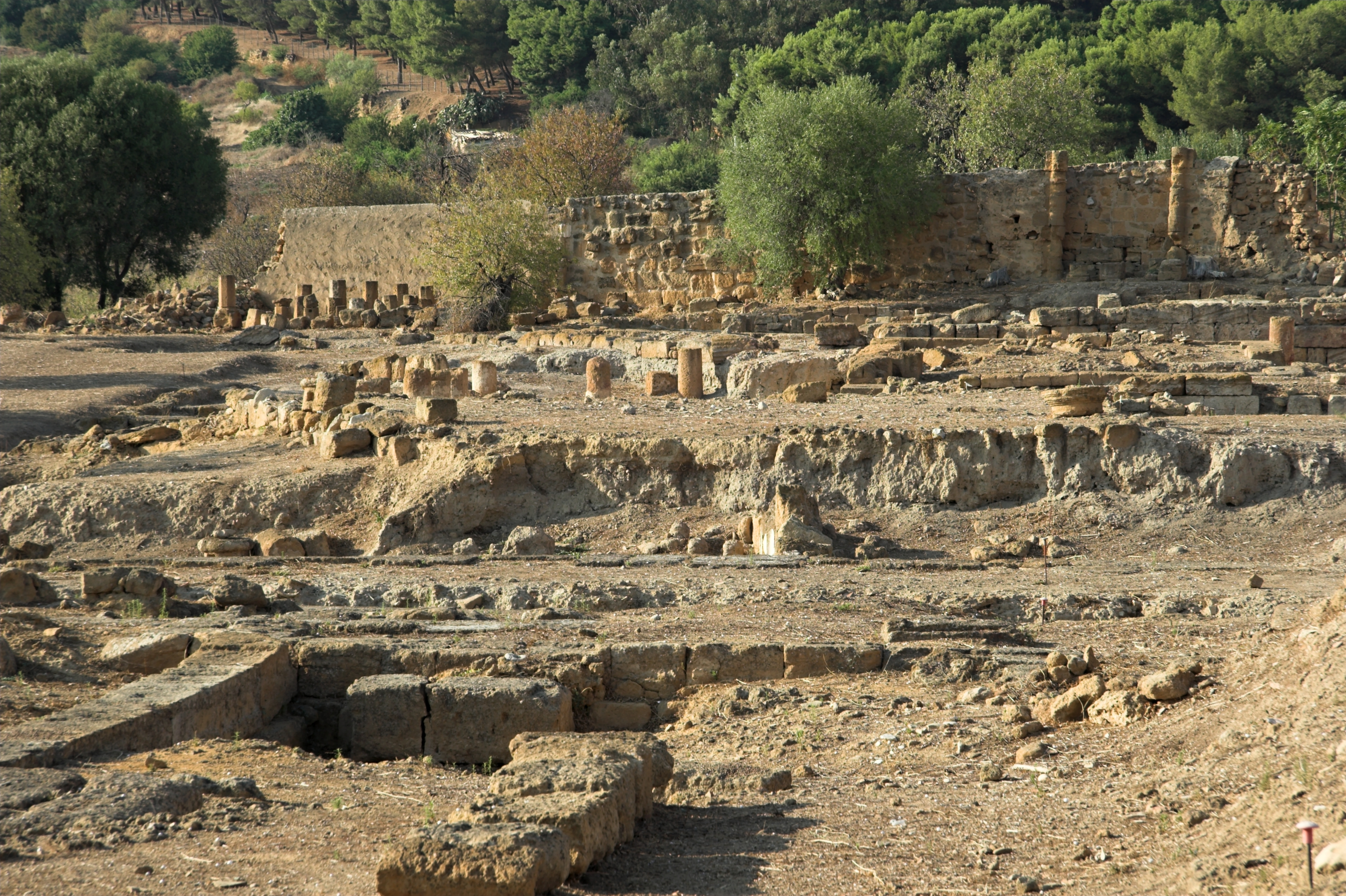
Ruins of the city

As winter had set in, Himilco did not push onto Gela but encamped at Akragas. The city, the richest in Sicily, was thoroughly plundered, and many priceless pieces of art were shipped to Carthage. The Carthaginian army would stay in the city until the spring of 405, when the campaign for Gela took place. Himilco would demolish the city before marching east.

The refugees of Akragas accused Daphnaeus and the other generals of treason in Syracuse. This caused a great upheaval which ultimately brought Dionysius I of Syracuse to the role of supreme commander, which he ultimately turned into a dictatorship.

The city of Akragas, destroyed in 405 BC, would again be populated by Greeks, although it would not reach the level of wealth and power it had previously enjoyed. It would grow powerful enough to oppose both Carthage and Syracuse in the struggle these cities would engage in for the next hundred years.

== Rebuilding and Roman period ==
Akragas was largely rebuilt around 338 BCE under the leadership of the Greek statesman Timoleon. Following its destruction by the Carthaginians in 406 BCE, the city remained in ruins and under their control for decades. When Timoleon arrived in Sicily, he defeated Carthaginian forces and promoted the recovery of several Greek cities. In Akragas, he encouraged the return of the descendants of the former inhabitants as well as the arrival of new Greek settlers, helping to repopulate, reorganize, and rebuild the city. This restored settlement occupied the same area as the modern city of Agrigento.

The city was disputed between the Romans and the Carthaginians during the First Punic War. The Romans laid siege to the city in 262 BC and captured it after defeating a Carthaginian relief force in 261 BC and sold the population into slavery. Although the Carthaginians recaptured the city in 255 BC, the final peace settlement ceded Punic Sicily, including Akragas, to Rome. It suffered badly during the Second Punic War (218–201 BC) when both Rome and Carthage fought to control it. The Romans eventually captured Akragas in 210 BC and renamed it Agrigentum, although it remained a largely Greek-speaking community for centuries thereafter. It became prosperous again under Roman rule. In the 2nd century BC, Scipio Africanus Minor bestowed upon the city a statue of Apollo by Myron, housed in the Temple of Asclepius as a symbol of their alliance during the Third Punic War.

Cicero noted Agrigentum as a civitas decumana and socius, highlighting its loyal service in the Third Punic War. He ranked Agrigentum among Sicily's largest cities, emphasizing its pivotal port and role in Roman governance, including hosting the governor's assize circuit. Additionally, he mentioned a sizable population of Roman citizens coexisting harmoniously with the Greek populace, likely engaged in commerce linked to the port.

An inscription indicates that the city was promoted to colonia status by Septimius Severus and renamed "Colonia Septimia Augusta Agrigentorum."

== Archeology ==
Archaeological interest in Akragas began in the early modern period, when travellers and antiquarians visited the ruins and recorded the impressive remains of its ancient temples. From the 18th and 19th centuries onward, the site was frequently described and sketched, although it was also heavily quarried for building materials. Early excavations were often unscientific, focusing on recovering architectural fragments from the monumental sacred zone.

Systematic archaeological work began in the 19th century, particularly with early excavations that targeted the major temple structures. Although methods were limited and documentation incomplete, these investigations first established the scale and preservation of Akragas’ monumental Doric architecture, including what is now identified as the Temple of Concordia and the remains of the Temple of Zeus, Olympia. These early studies laid the foundation for later scholarly reconstruction of the city's layout.

From the 20th century onward, more structured archaeological research was carried out across the site, particularly within the area now known as the Valle dei Templi. Geophysical investigation in recent decades has identified buried urban features, including the remains of a previously unknown theatre, confirming that the city's organisation extended well beyond its sacred centre. Stratigraphic evidence of destruction layers dating to the late

5th century BCE also corresponds with the Carthaginian siege of 406–405 BCE, offering archaeological support for the historical record of the city's collapse.

== Gallery ==
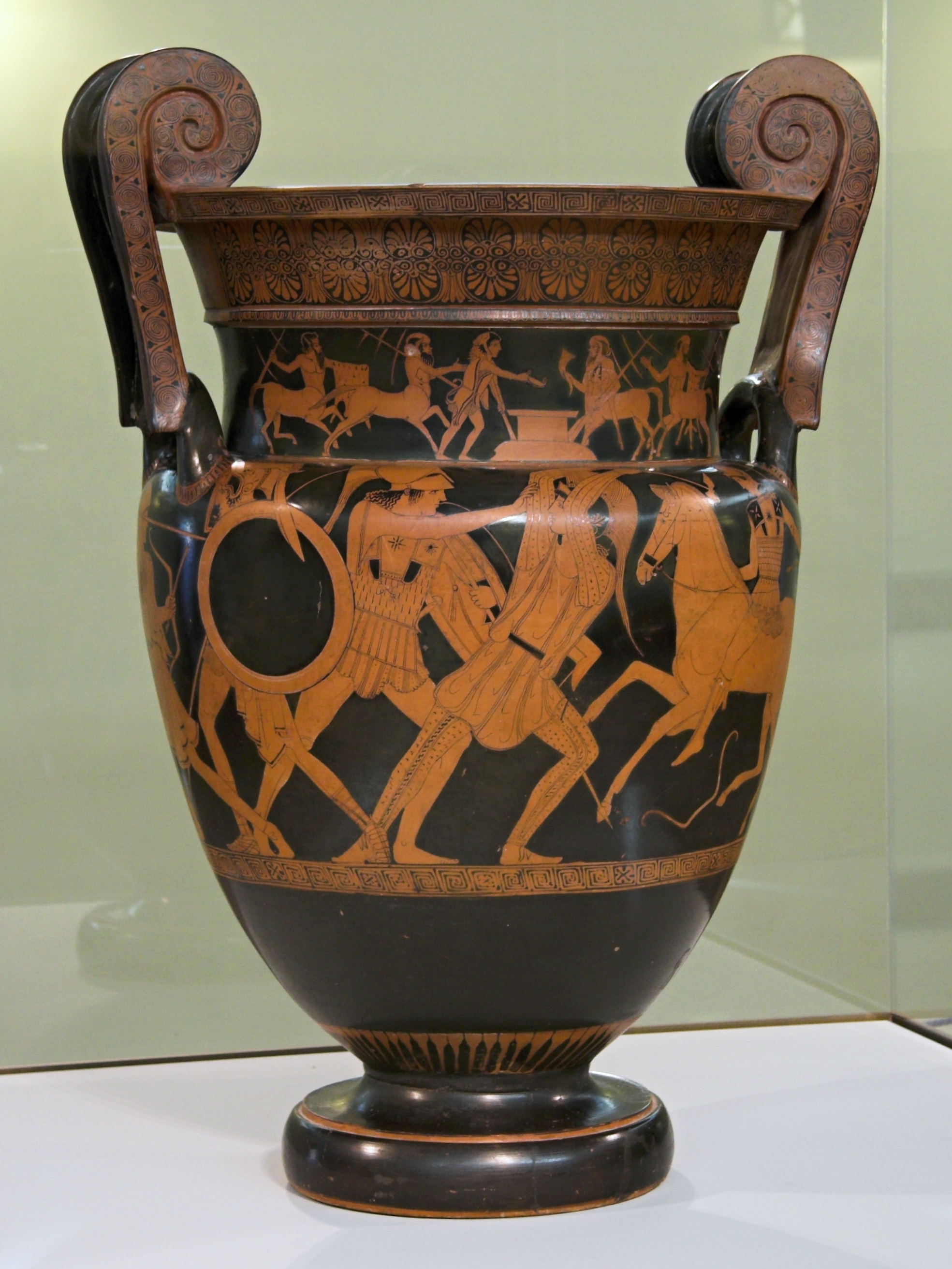
Column crater in red figure, Centauromachy, Amazonomachy, 460 BC

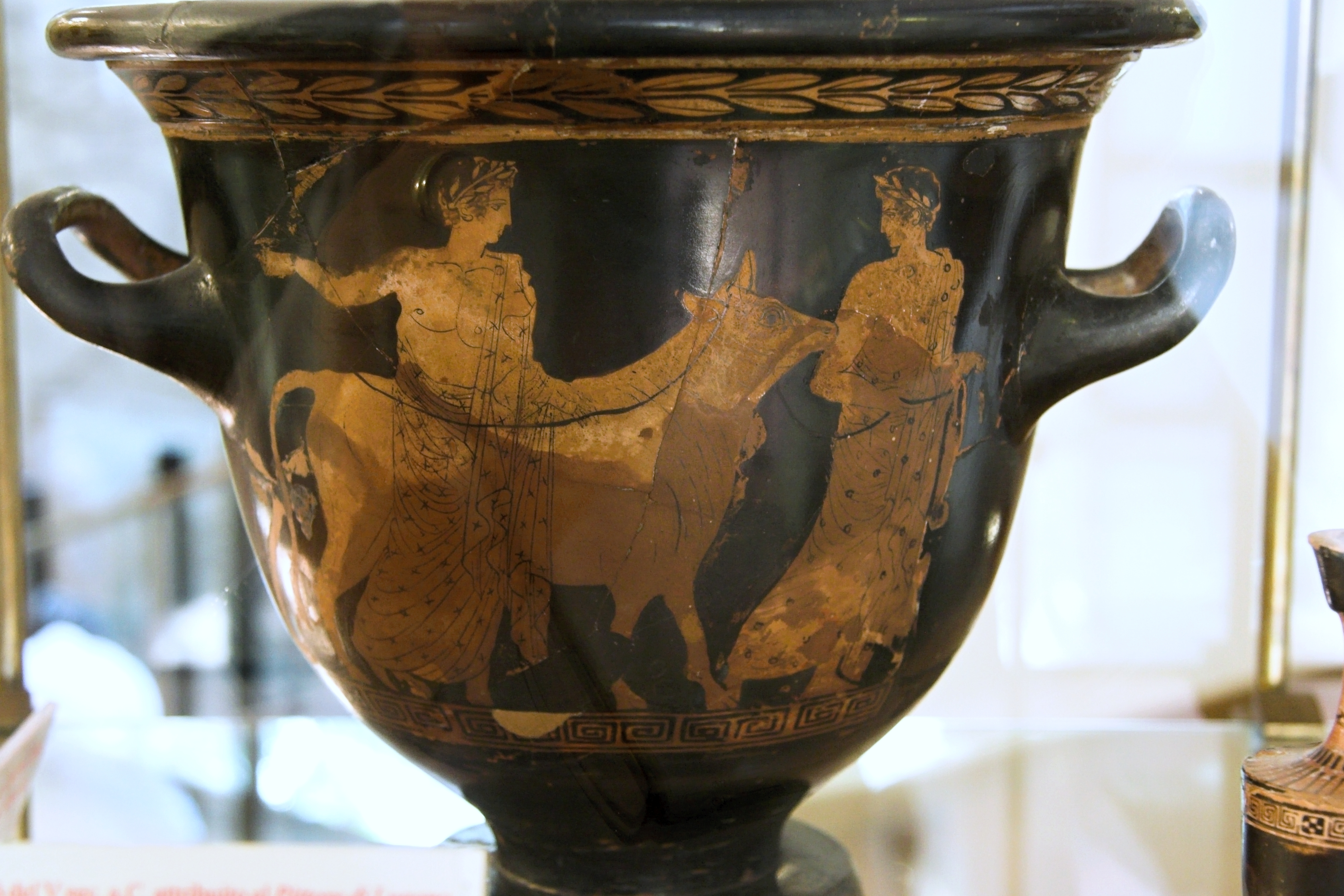
Bell crater, red figure, bull sacrifice, 440-400 BC

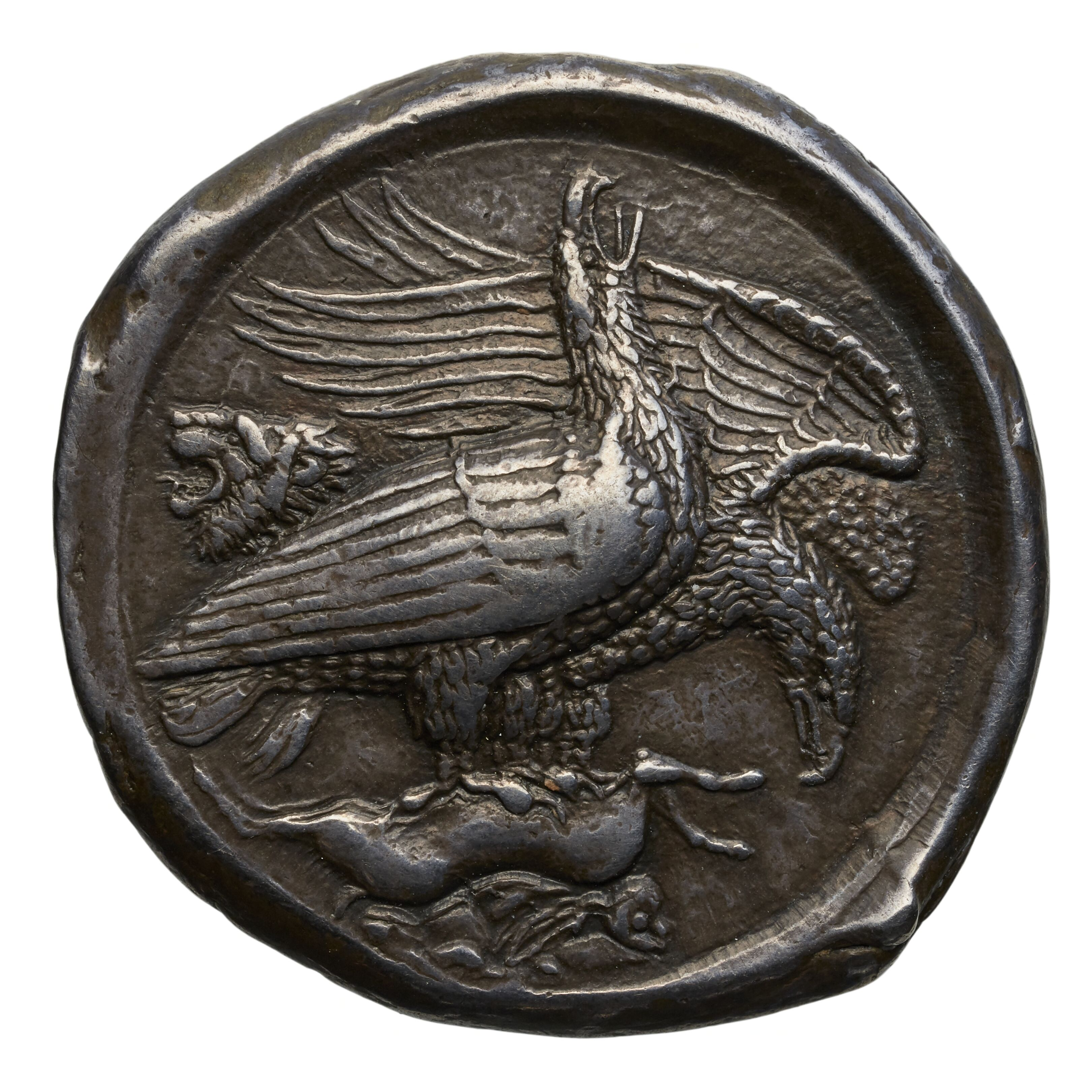
Tetradrachm of Akragas 410 BC

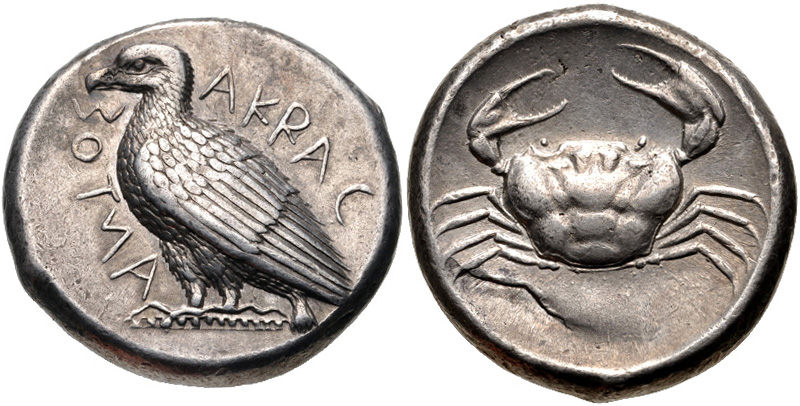
Silver Tetradrachm, Akragas, 465-446 BC
