= Terillus =

Early 5th-century BC tyrant of Himera, Sicily

Terillus (Greek: Τήριλλος; fl. early 5th century BC) was a son of Crinippus, tyrant of Himera, in Sicily, Magna Graecia.

Nothing is known about how Terillus rose to power. Nor is there any information available to historians about the duration or events of his reign. Rather, knowledge about Terillus relies on his interactions with other historical figures.

Terillus sought to consolidate his power as tyrant of Himera by giving his daughter Cydippe in marriage to Anaxilas, the ruler of Rhegium. Terillus also maintained good relations with the Carthaginian general Hamilcar.

Hence, when Terillus was expelled in 483 BC from Himera by Theron, tyrant of Agrigentum, Terillus sought assistance from the Carthaginians. His son-in-law, Anaxilas, not only supported his request to the Carthaginians for assistance, but offered his own children as hostages to the Carthaginians. In response, the Carthaginians decided to assist Terillus' bid to be restored to power in Himera. Yet, they used Terillus' request as the basis for extending their own power in Sicily. So the expulsion of Terillus by Theron of Acragas became the excuse for a major Carthaginian expedition under Hamilcar against the Greek cities in Sicily, which would end in a major Carthaginian defeat in the Battle of Himera in 480 BC.

Nothing is known of the fate of Terillus after the defeat of his allies at Himera.
